= Sarah Hunt Lockrey =

American physician and suffragist

- Born: April 21, 1863; Philadelphia, Pennsylvania
- Died: November 8, 1929 (aged 60); Philadelphia, Pennsylvania
- Education: Woman's Medical College of Pennsylvania 1888
- Occupation: Physician

Dr. Sarah Hunt Lockrey (1863–1929) was an American physician and suffragist from Philadelphia, Pennsylvania.

== Early life and education ==
Lockrey was born on April 21, 1863, in Philadelphia, Pennsylvania. She graduated from Woman's Medical College of Pennsylvania (WMCP) in 1888. After interning with Dr. Anna Broomall at WMCP, Lockrey went on to become chief of the gynecological staff there.

== Career ==
Lockrey worked at the West Philadelphia Hospital for Women and the Elwyn School for the Feeble-Minded. She was a physician at Methodist Deaconess Home for more than two decades. She focused on improving women's healthcare, and specialized in gynecology and gynecological surgery. She was also a member of the American Medical Association (AMA), a Fellow of the American College of Surgeons, and a member of the Medical Women's National Association (MWNA).

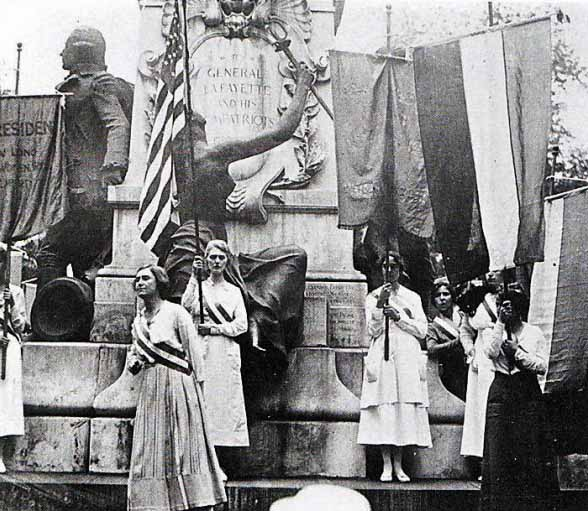
National Woman's Party Members in Lafayette Park August 6, 1918

Lockrey was a member of the National Woman's Party (NWP), and served on the NWP's National Advisory Council. She participated in the August 6, 1918, demonstration at Lafayette Square, Washington, D.C., and was arrested and charges with "holding a meeting on public grounds" and sentenced to jail. Rather than serve her sentence, Dr. Lockrey paid a fine so that she could return to Philadelphia to perform surgery. In 1920, Lockry received the NWP's "prison pin."

Lockrey died in Philadelphia on November 8, 1929.

== See also ==
- List of suffragists and suffragettes
