= Emeline Horton Cleveland =

American physician

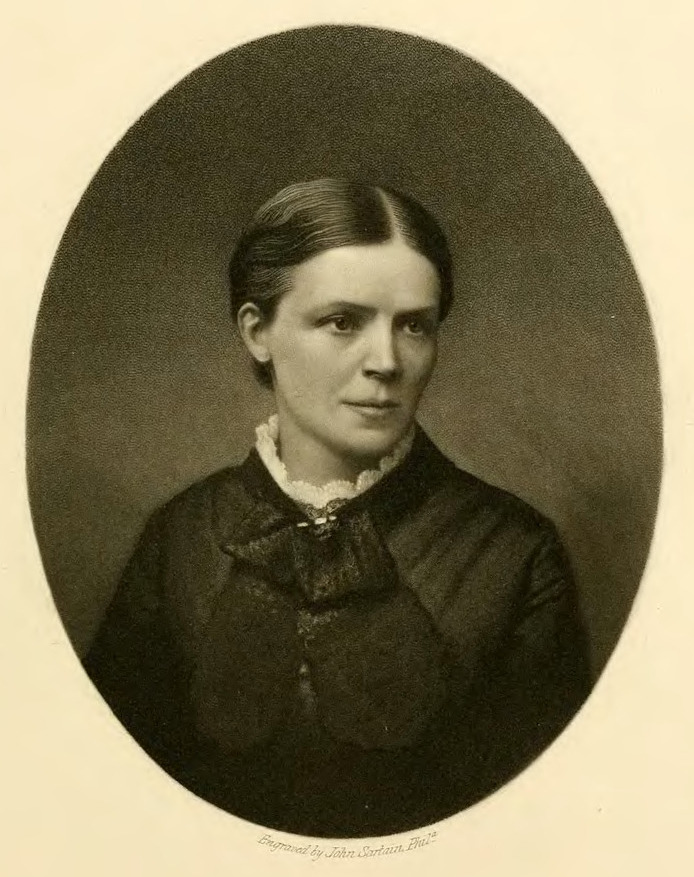
- Born: Emeline Horton; September 22, 1829; Ashford, Connecticut, US
- Died: December 8, 1878 (aged 49); Philadelphia, Pennsylvania, US
- Medical career
- Profession: Medicine
- Institutions: Women's Medical College of Pennsylvania
- Sub-specialties: Obstetrics and gynecology

Emeline Horton Cleveland (September 22, 1829 – December 8, 1878) was an American medical doctor and one of the first women to perform major abdominal or gynecological surgery in the United States. She became one of the first woman physicians associated with a large public hospital in the United States, and she established one of the first nursing assistant training programs in the country.

A graduate of Oberlin College and the Women's Medical College of Pennsylvania, Cleveland received postgraduate training in obstetrics and gynecology and hospital administration in Philadelphia, Paris, and London. By 1872, she was the dean of the Woman's Medical College. Cleveland suffered from tuberculosis for the last several years of her life.

== Early life ==
Cleveland was born Emeline Horton in Ashford, Connecticut, to Chauncey Horton and Amanda Chaffee Horton. Her paternal ancestors had been Puritans who emigrated to the United States in the 1630s. Cleveland was the second of eight siblings. When Cleveland was two years old, her family moved to a farm in Madison County, New York, where she was educated by tutors. Though Cleveland had childhood aspirations of becoming a missionary, her father's death led her to work as a teacher in order to fund her college education.

In 1850, Cleveland enrolled at Oberlin College and graduated three years later. She had begun corresponding with Sarah Josepha Hale, who was the editor of a women's magazine Godey's Lady's Book. Hale was also secretary of the newly-formed Pennsylvania Ladies' Missionary Society, and she told Cleveland about efforts at the Female Medical College of Pennsylvania (later known as the Women's Medical College of Pennsylvania) to train women to serve as missionary physicians. Cleveland earned a medical degree after two years at the Female Medical College.

While in medical school, Cleveland had married a childhood friend of hers, Giles Butler Cleveland. Giles Cleveland had studied at Oberlin Theological Seminary to become a Presbyterian minister at the same time that Emmeline studied at Oberlin. The couple both wanted to work as missionaries, but Giles became ill, eliminating the possibility of mission work. To support them, Emeline opened a medical practice in Oneida Valley, New York. By late 1856, she was invited to teach anatomy courses at the Female Medical College of Pennsylvania, so Cleveland and her husband returned to Philadelphia.

== Career ==
In Philadelphia, Giles Cleveland found work as a teacher. A little over a year after their arrival, he became seriously ill again, and he was left partially paralyzed and unable to work. Cleveland stayed at the Female Medical College until 1860, when her colleague Ann Preston and several local Quaker women paid for Cleveland to go to Paris and London to continue her studies in obstetrics, gynecological surgery and hospital administration.

Returning to Philadelphia in 1862, Cleveland became chief resident at the Woman's Hospital of Philadelphia, which Preston had established while Cleveland was in Europe. The goal of the hospital was to provide patient care experience for medical students at the Woman's Medical College of Pennsylvania, as they often faced discrimination in trying to gain clinical experiences at other hospitals. In 1872, Cleveland became the dean of the medical school upon Preston's death. Cleveland established training programs for nurses at the college, and she started one of the earliest programs to train nursing assistants. Her health was tenuous, which led to her resignation as dean in 1874.

In 1875, an article was published in a regional medical journal regarding Cleveland's performance of an ovariotomy in a patient who had been suffering from a cystic tumor of the ovary that had led to a large fluid collection within the abdomen. One of Cleveland's students wrote the journal article, making a concluding point that Cleveland's work was evidence that women could make good surgeons.

== Death ==
In 1878, Cleveland was named a gynecologist for the Pennsylvania Hospital Department for the Insane, marking one of the first times that a woman had become a physician for a large public hospital. She died of tuberculosis later that year. She was buried next to Ann Preston at Fair Hill Cemetery in Philadelphia. She was survived by her husband and by a son, Arthur Horton Cleveland, who also became a physician. She was succeeded as chair of obstetrics by her mentee, Dr. Anna Broomall.

Cleveland's legacy was that of a physician who combined medical acumen with femininity and a down-to-earth demeanor. These factors may have helped her succeed in a male-dominated field because she was not seen as trying to upset the social order between men and women. Mary Corinna Putnam Jacobi, an influential physician who attended the Female Medical College in the 1860s, said that Cleveland was "a woman of real ability... personal beauty, and grace of manner."

== Sources ==
- Peitzman, Steven Jay (2000). A New and Untried Course: Woman's Medical College and Medical College of Pennsylvania, 1850-1998. Rutgers University Press. ISBN 9780813528168.
