= John B. Hinkson =

American politician

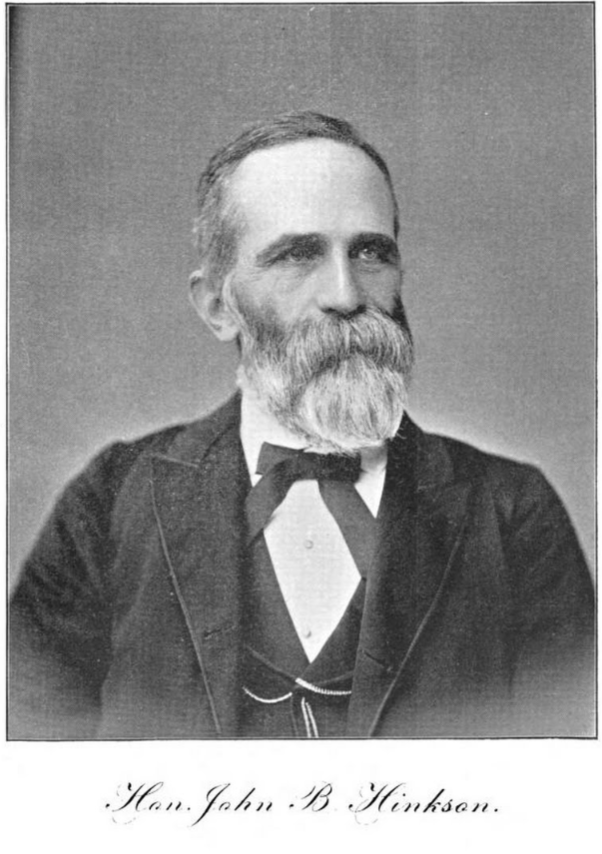

Mayor of Chester, Pennsylvania
- In office 1893–1896
- Preceded by: Major Joseph R. T. Coates
- Succeeded by: Crosby M. Black

Chester City Council
- In office 1876–1876

Personal details
- Born: 1840 Chester, Pennsylvania, U.S.
- Died: May 22, 1901 (aged 60–61) Chester, Pennsylvania, U.S.
- Resting place: Chester Rural Cemetery, Chester, Pennsylvania, U.S.
- Party: Democratic
- Spouse: Kate W. Caldwell
- Education: Lafayette College

John Baker Hinkson (October 2, 1840 - May 22, 1901) was an American lawyer, businessman and politician from Pennsylvania who served as a Democratic mayor of Chester from 1893 to 1896.

== Early life and education ==
Hinkson was born in Chester, Pennsylvania to Joseph H. and Lydia Ann (Edwards) Hinkson.

Hinkson graduated from Lafayette College in Easton, Pennsylvania with a Bachelor of Arts degree in 1860 and a Master of Arts in 1863. He was elected as a member of the Phi Beta Kappa academic honor society.

Hinkson studied law with the Honorable John M. Broomall and was admitted to the bar of Delaware County in August, 1863.

== Career ==
Hinkson had a private law practice in Chester, Pennsylvania.

Hinkson served on the Chester City Council in 1876 and defeated Major Joseph R.T. Coates to serve as mayor of Chester from 1893 to 1896. He ran for Pennsylvania State Senate but was defeated by Thomas Valentine Cooper.

Hinkson was a member of the Board of Trustees of the Pennsylvania Military College and served as Secretary and Treasurer until his death.

Hinkson was a director of the Delaware County Trust, Safe Deposit and Title Insurance Company and of the Esrey Manufacturing Company.

== Personal life ==
In 1864, Hinkson married Kate W. Caldwell and together they had five children.

Hinkson and his wife were members of the Third Presbyterian Church of Chester where Hinkson served as an elder and trustee.

Hinkson is interred at the Chester Rural Cemetery in Chester, Pennsylvania.

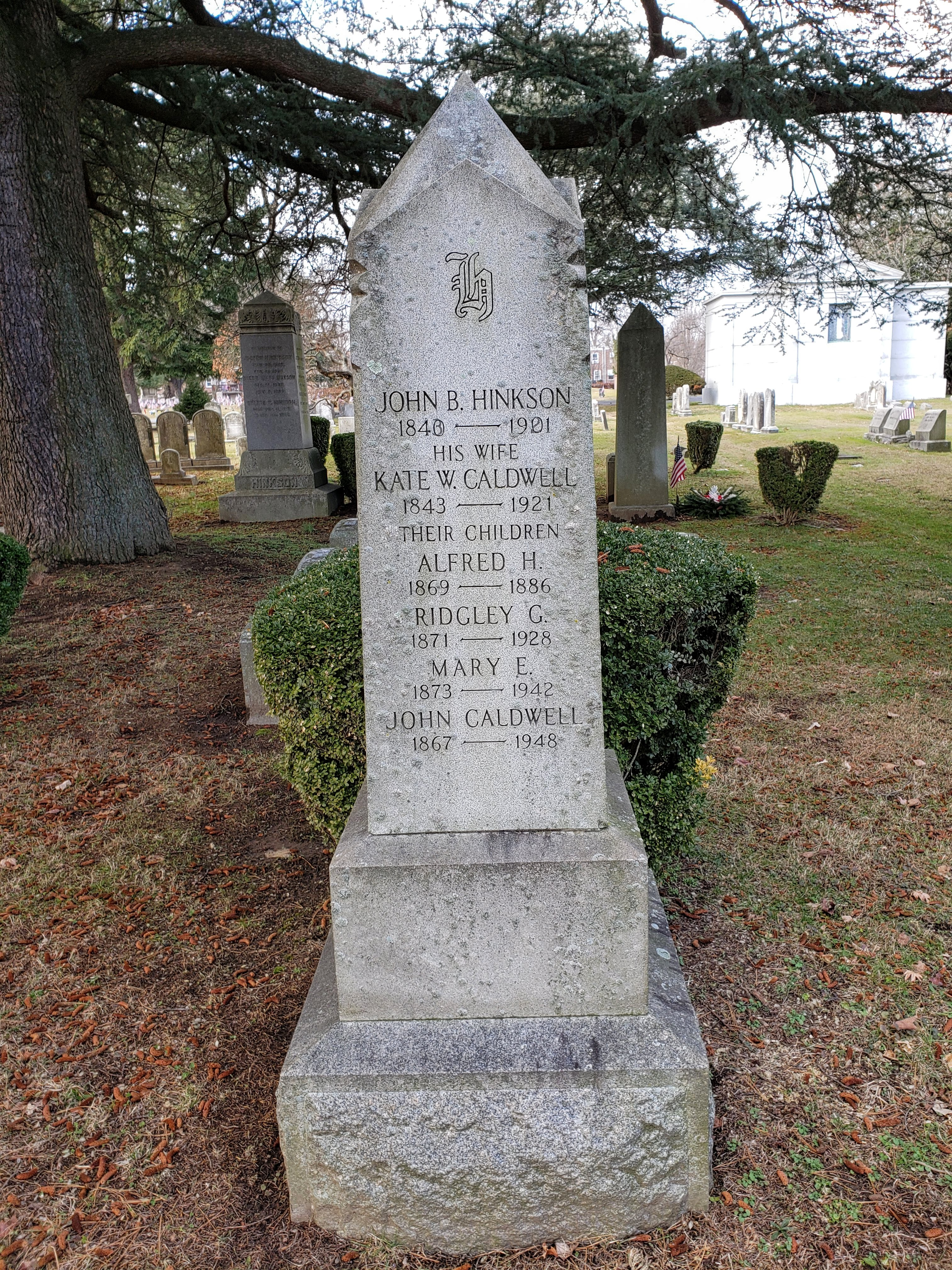
John B Hinkson grave in Chester Rural Cemetery

== See also ==
- List of mayors of Chester, Pennsylvania

Political offices
Preceded by	Councilman Chester City Council; 1876–1876	Succeeded by
Preceded by Major Joseph R.T. Coates	Mayor of Chester; 1893–1896	Succeeded by Crosby M. Black
