= St. John's Church (Concord, Pennsylvania) =

Episcopal church in Delaware County

Coordinates: 39.877971°N 75.506173°W

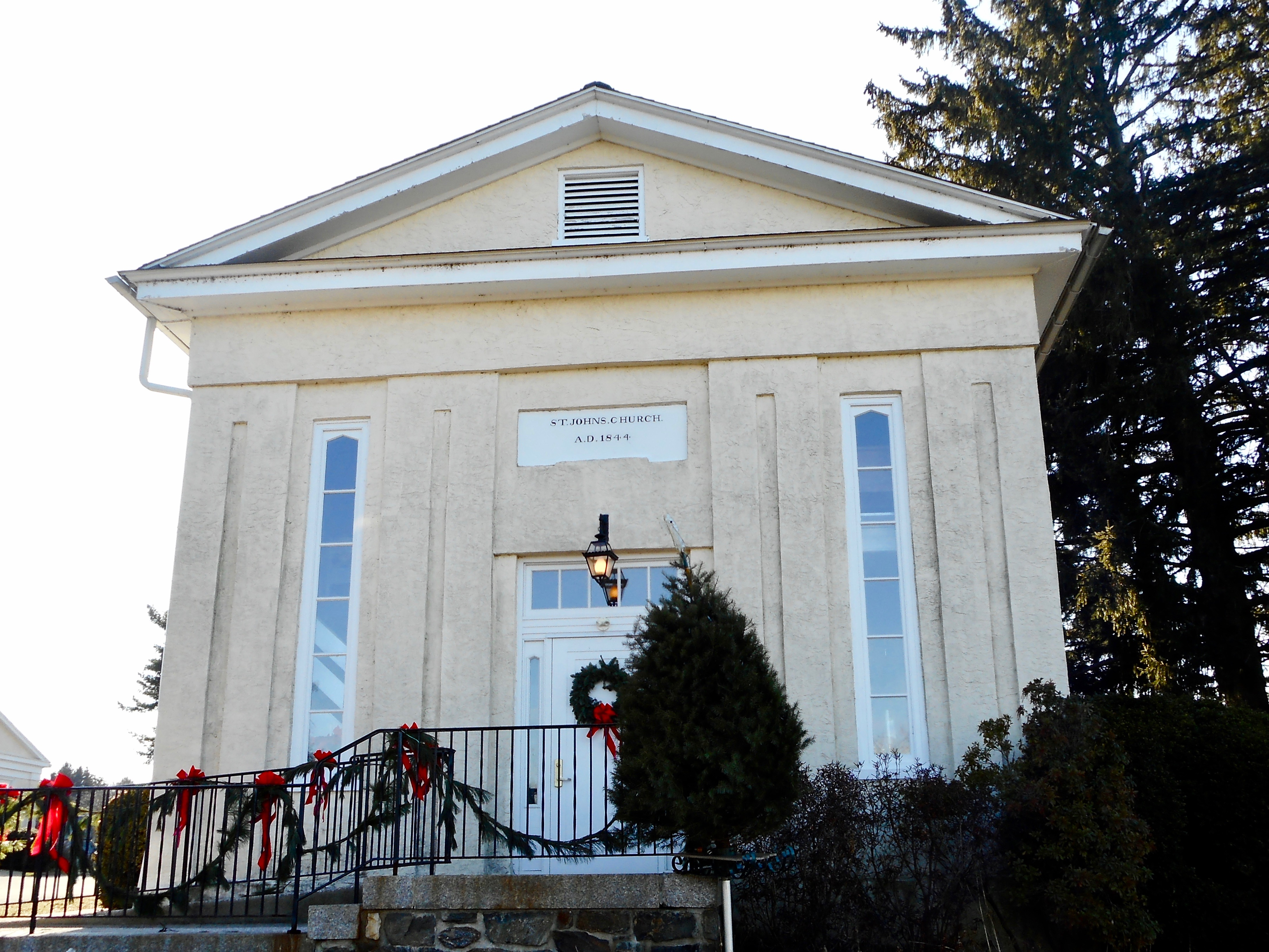
St. John's from the southeast

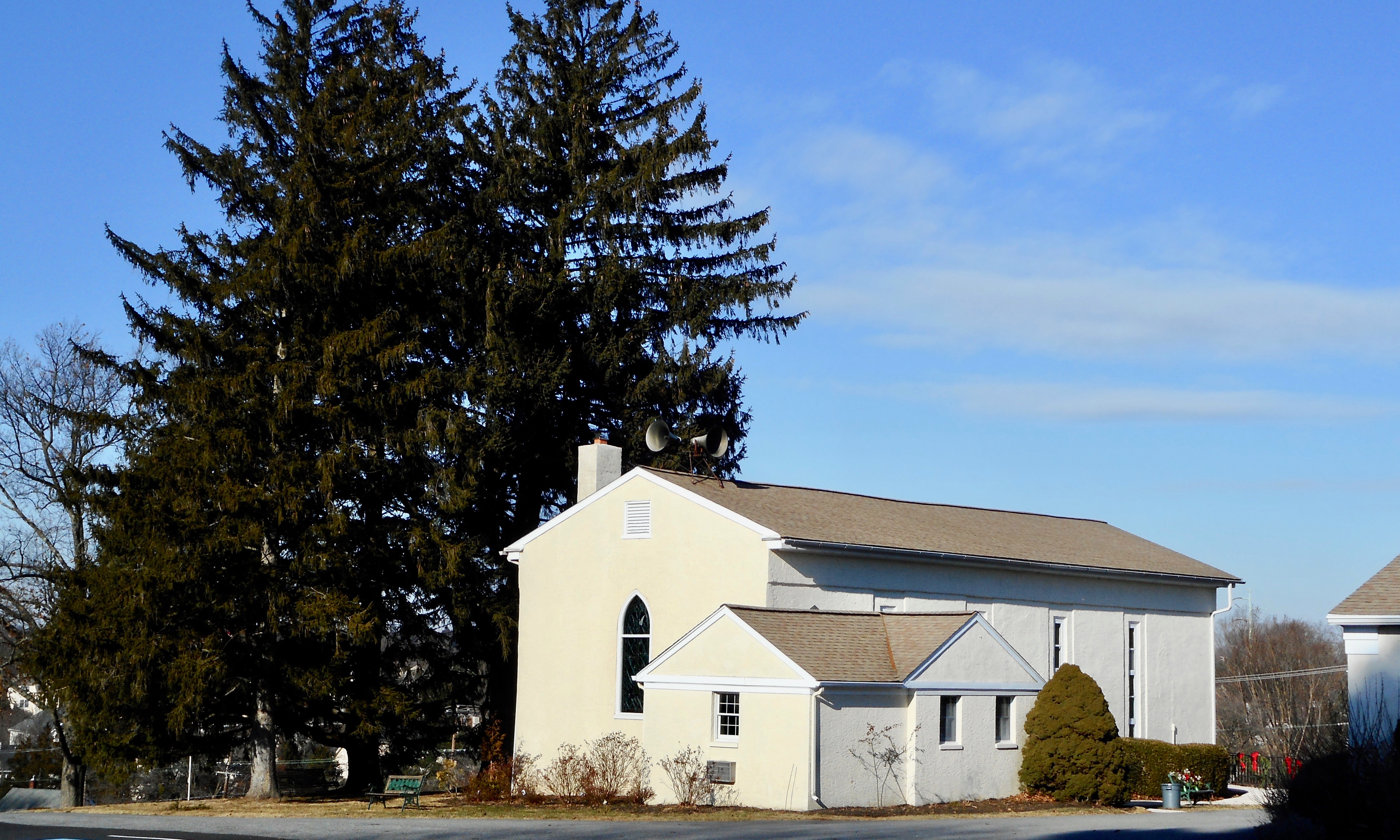
St. John's from the southwest

St. John's Church is an Episcopal church founded in 1702 in Concord Township, Delaware County, Pennsylvania, United States. It is located at 576 Concord Road and is an active worship center.

== History ==
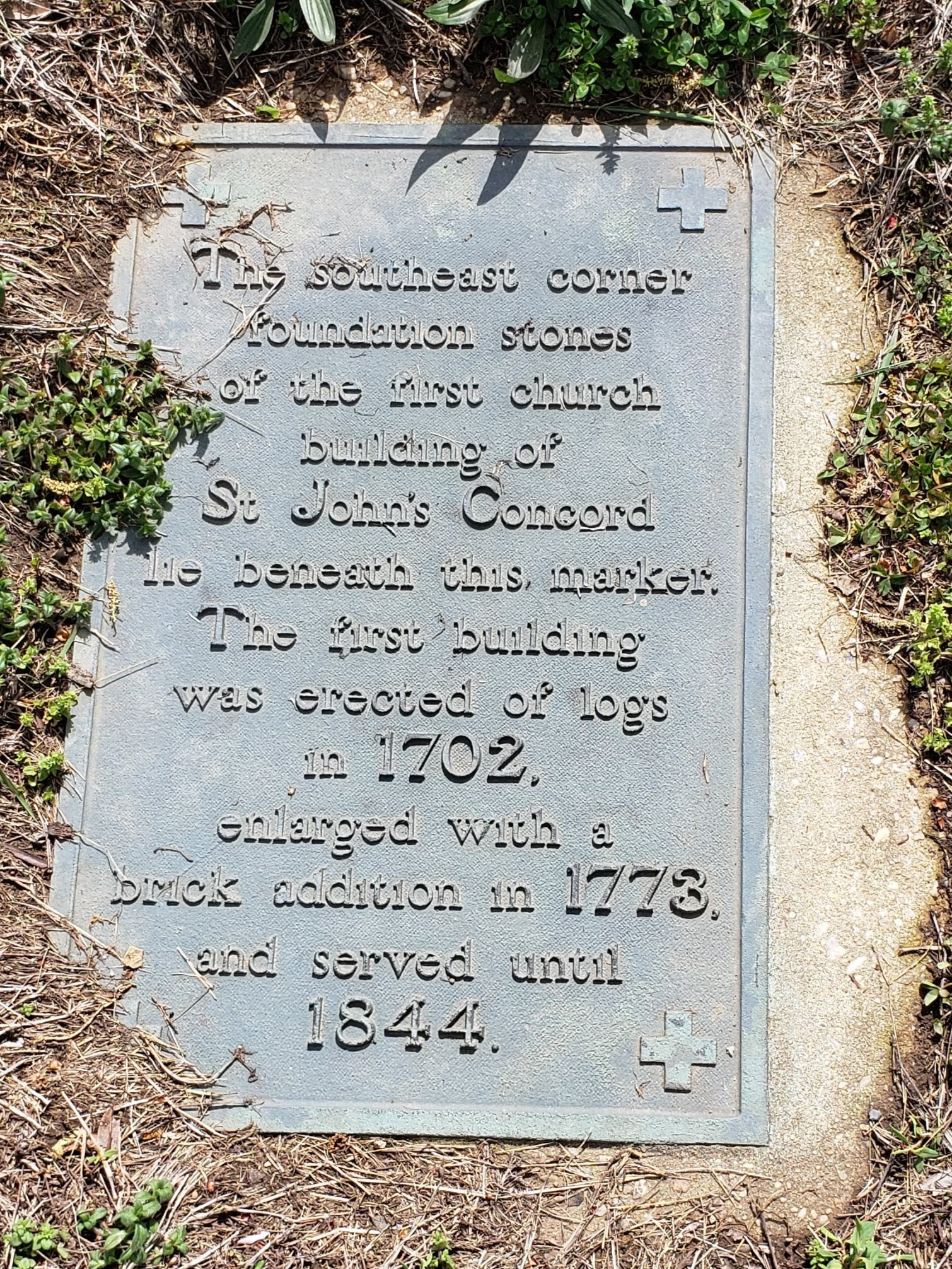
Marker depicting the southeast corner of the church built in 1702

St. John's Church was founded in 1702 when John Hannum donated land and a log building was erected. John Hannum was a successful farmer and tavern owner who was baptized by the former Quaker, George Keith, who was known to conduct services in the Hannum home in Concord.

St. John's Church was originally part of the St. Paul's Church in Chester, Pennsylvania parish along with St. Martin's Church in Marcus Hook, Pennsylvania. In 1704, Reverend Henry Nichols was sent by The Society for the Propagation of the Gospel in Foreign Parts as a missionary to work in all three churches.

In 1707, Reverend Evan Evans, the first Rector at St. John's, travelled to England and returned the same year with a pewter Holy Communion Service, a gift from Queen Anne to the parish.

Missionaries were sent from Philadelphia to preach to the congregation, however problems arose due to the distance the preachers had to travel and the church began to have ministers from the Swedish Church in Wilmington, Delaware preside over the congregation.

Israel Acrelius, the noted Swedish Lutheran missionary and priest is known to have preached at St. John's Church during his travels in America in 1749.

In 1773, a western end laid with bricks was added to the frame church. In 1790, an eastern end of the church was added laid with stone and replaced the original structure that the congregation had worshipped in for almost a century.

In 1837, another addition to the church was made, however it was decided that a new church was needed since the previous structure had been added to several times and was no longer sufficient to meet the needs of the congregation. On October 27, 1844, a new church was consecrated and still stands today.

In 1884, a chancel window was added as a memorial to Henry Onderdonk, the second Bishop of the Episcopal Diocese of Pennsylvania.

== Notable burials ==
- William Garrigues Powel – Pennsylvania State Representative
