= George Ripley Bliss =

American cleric and educator (1816–1893)

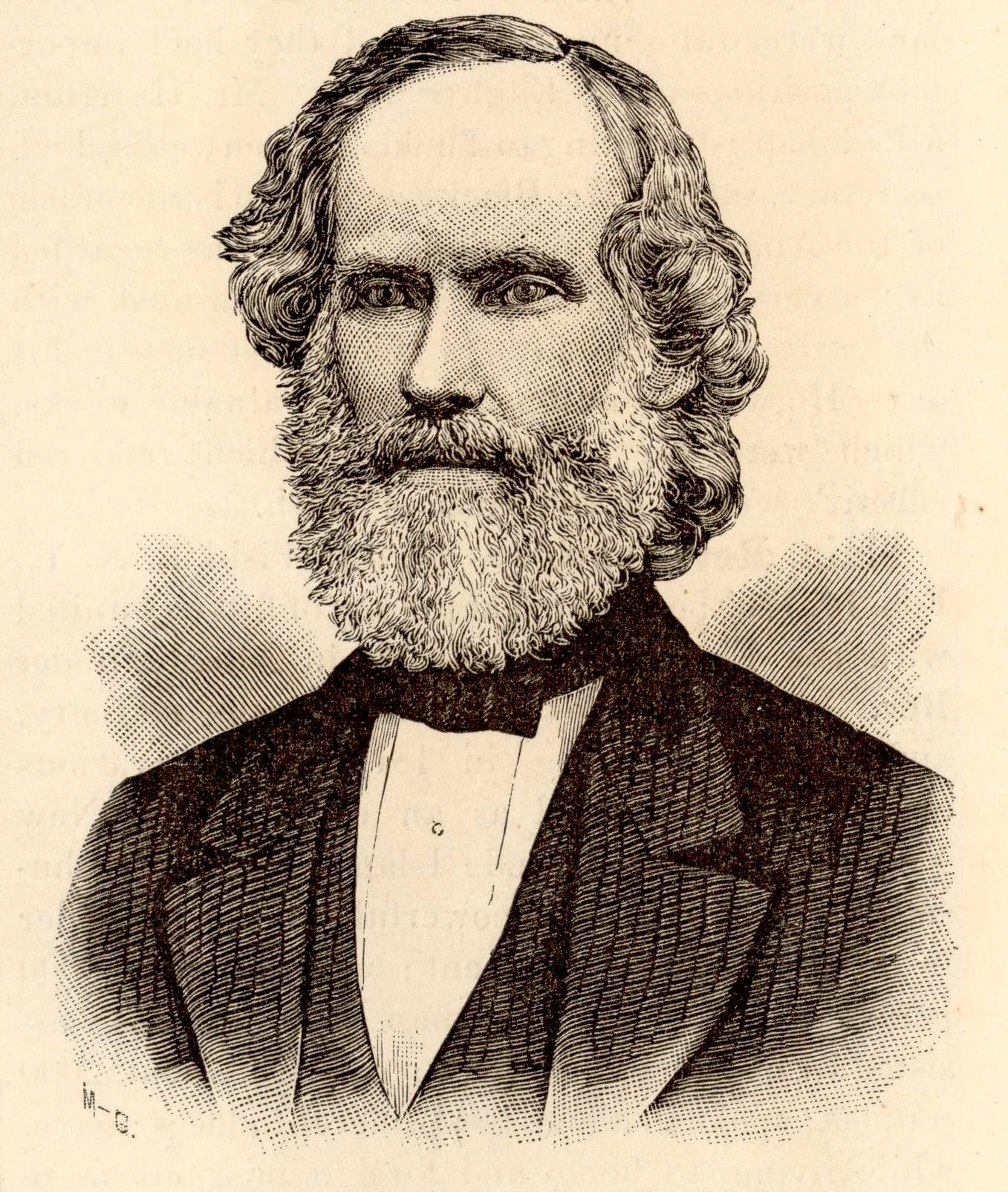
- Sketch of Bliss in a 1881 publication

3rd President of Bucknell University
- In office 1857–1872
- Preceded by: Howard Malcom
- Succeeded by: Justin Rolph Loomis

Personal details
- Born: June 20, 1816 Sherburne, New York, U.S.
- Died: March 21, 1893 (aged 76) Lewisburg, Pennsylvania, U.S.
- Resting place: Lewisburg Cemetery
- Spouse: Mary Ann Raymond
- Children: 13, including Tasker and Ward
- Education: Hamilton College; Hamilton Theological Seminary

George Ripley Bliss (June 20, 1816 – March 21, 1893) was an American cleric and educator. He served twice as president of Bucknell University.

== Early life ==
George R. Bliss was born in Sherburne, New York on June 20, 1816. He graduated from Hamilton College and Hamilton Theological Seminary and became a Baptist clergyman.

== Career ==
Bliss taught Greek (filling the department chair from 1849 to 1874), Latin, and biblical exegesis at Bucknell and at Crozer Theological Seminary, and he served as librarian of Bucknell University. He served as university president twice, in 1857–1858 and 1871–72.

== Death and burial ==
Bliss died in Lewisburg, Pennsylvania, on March 21, 1893. He was buried in Lewisburg Cemetery.

== Family ==
Bliss married to Mary Ann Raymond (1821-1912). They had 13 children. His son General Tasker Howard Bliss served as Chief of Staff of the United States Army from 1917 until 1918. His son Ward R. Bliss served in the Pennsylvania House of Representatives.
