= Jesse Matlack Baker =

American politician (1854–1913)

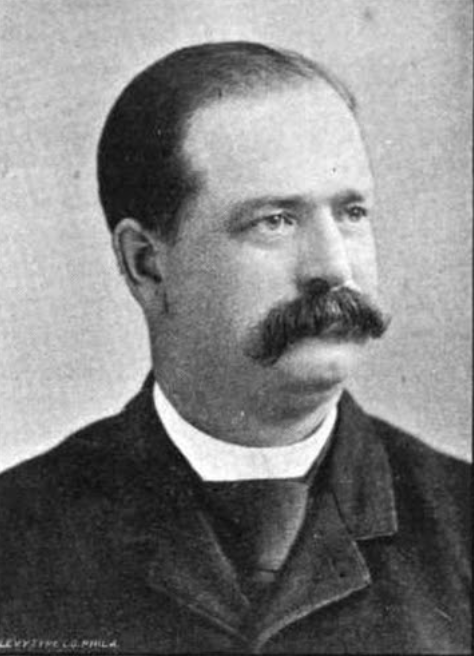

Pennsylvania House of Representatives, Delaware County
- In office 1889–1892
- Preceded by: John Buchanan Robinson
- Succeeded by: Albert Magnin

Pennsylvania Senate, 9th District
- In office 1893–1897
- Preceded by: John Buchanan Robinson
- Succeeded by: William Cameron Sproul

Personal details
- Born: March 1, 1854 Parkesburg, Pennsylvania, U.S.
- Died: July 30, 1913 (aged 59) Media, Pennsylvania, U.S.
- Resting place: Media Cemetery, Upper Providence Township, Pennsylvania, U.S.
- Party: Republican

Jesse Matlack Baker (March 1, 1854 – July 30, 1913) was an American politician from Pennsylvania who served as a Republican member of the Pennsylvania House of Representatives for Delaware County from 1889 to 1892 and the Pennsylvania State Senate for the 9th district from 1893 to 1897.

== Early life and education ==
Jesse Matlack Baker was born on March 1, 1854, in Parkesburg, Pennsylvania, to Phebe Ann (née Matlack) and John Mitchell Baker. He attended public schools and entered the Pennsylvania Military Academy in Chester, Pennsylvania. In 1871, he became a cadet at West Point Military Academy and was honorably discharged in 1873. He studied law under V. Gilpin Robinson and was accepted to the Delaware County bar in 1881.

== Military career ==
Baker served as Captain of Company H, 6th regiment, Pennsylvania National Guard from 1877 to 1898. He was a Major in the U.S. Army and served in the Spanish American War in 1898.

== Political career ==
Baker served as district attorney for Delaware County from 1882 to 1888. He was elected to the Pennsylvania House of Representatives for Delaware County and served from 1888 to 1892.

Baker was elected to the Pennsylvania State Senate for the 9th district in 1892. He served as chairman of the Military Committee and as a member of Elections, Corporations, Judiciary General and Special, Insurance, Mines and Mining and Legislative Apportionment.

== Personal life ==
His sister Sallie M. Baker married Pennsylvania lawyer and politician V. Gilpin Robinson.

Baker died at his home in Media, Pennsylvania, on July 30, 1913, after a bout of Bright's disease. He was interred at the Media Cemetery in Upper Providence Township, Pennsylvania.

Pennsylvania House of Representatives
| Preceded by John Buchanan Robinson | Member of the Pennsylvania House of Representatives, Delaware County; 1889–1892 | Succeeded by Albert Magnin |
Pennsylvania State Senate
| Preceded by John Buchanan Robinson | Member of the Pennsylvania Senate, 9th district 1893-1897 | Succeeded by William Cameron Sproul |
