= Woman's Hospital of Philadelphia =

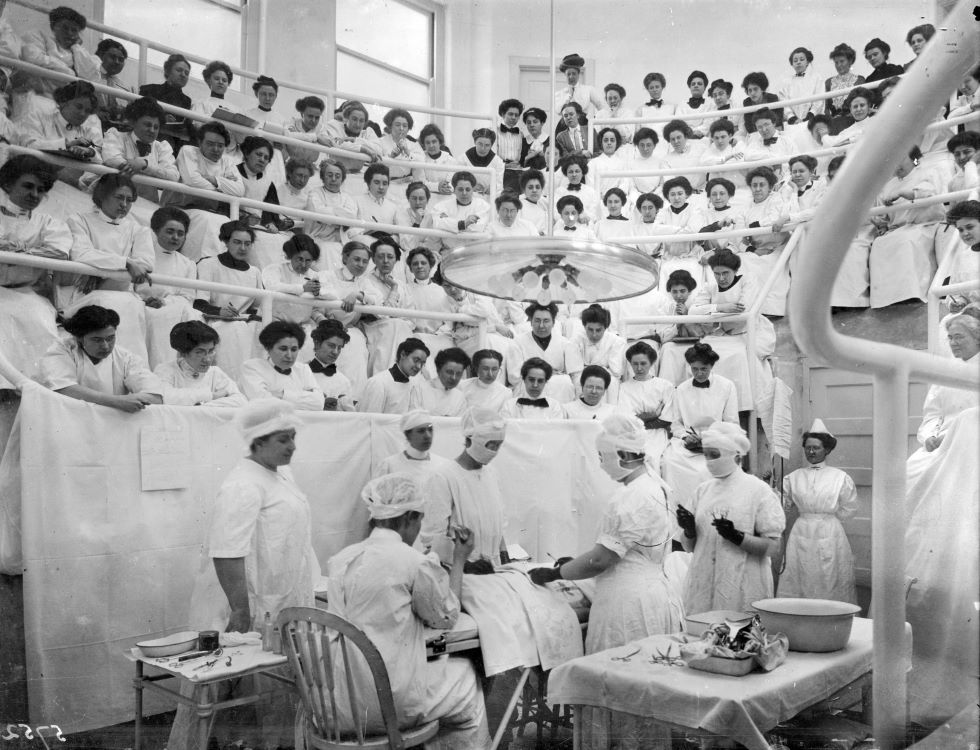
- 1911

Geography
- Location: Philadelphia, Pennsylvania, United States
- Coordinates: 39.974858°N 75.172095°W

History
- Opened: 1861

Links
- Lists: Hospitals in Pennsylvania

The Woman's Hospital of Philadelphia was established in 1861 to provide clinical experience for Woman's Medical College of Pennsylvania students, a group of Quaker women, particularly Ann Preston.

== History ==
Its purposes were to “establish in Philadelphia, a Hospital for the treatment of diseases of women and children, and for obstetrical cases; furnishing at the same time facilities for clinical instruction to women engaged in the study of medicine, and for the practical training of nurses; the chief resident physician to be a woman.” Though most medical care in the 19th century occurred at home or in a practitioner's office, the “teaching hospital” could provide, as clinical material, many patients gathered in one place for some time, who could be examined while the course of their diseases was observed.

Woman's Hospital accepted its first patient, to the Lying In Department (maternity), on December 16, 1861. By April 1862, twelve patients occupied beds. The Woman's Hospital grew steadily; by 1875 it housed 37 beds, treated nearly 2,000 patients at their homes (home visits were carried out largely by students), and saw more than 3,000 visitors in its dispensary. Women and children were admitted “without regard to their religious belief, nationality, or color.” They generally did not accept pregnant women who were unwed. At least one woman staff physician pleaded for “sympathizing care,” saying it could do more to change a life than moralistic rejection.

In 1867, the Female Medical College of Pennsylvania legally changed its name to Woman's Medical College of Pennsylvania. In 1874, the college began construction of its own building, thanks to an earlier bequest of Isaac Barton, one of the corporators. The new location was adjacent to the Woman's Hospital of Pennsylvania on North College Avenue. The architecture contract was given to Addison Hutton. In 1888, Dr. Anna Broomall established the hospital's outpatient maternity clinic (the first in the United States).

== Notable people ==
- Mary A. G. Dight (1860-1923), physician
- Elizabeth C. Keller (1837-1912), physician
