= Albert Magnin =

American politician

Pennsylvania House of Representatives, Delaware County
- In office 1889–1892
- Preceded by: Jesse Matlack Baker
- Succeeded by: Ward R. Bliss

Personal details
- Born: April 13, 1846 Philadelphia, Pennsylvania, U.S.
- Died: March 18, 1906 (aged 59) Darby, Pennsylvania, U.S.
- Resting place: Arlington Cemetery, Drexel Hill, Pennsylvania, U.S.
- Party: Republican
- Spouse: Ellen Jane Magnin

Albert Magnin (April 13, 1846 - March 18, 1906) was an American politician from Pennsylvania who served as a Republican member of the Pennsylvania House of Representatives for Delaware County from 1889 to 1892.

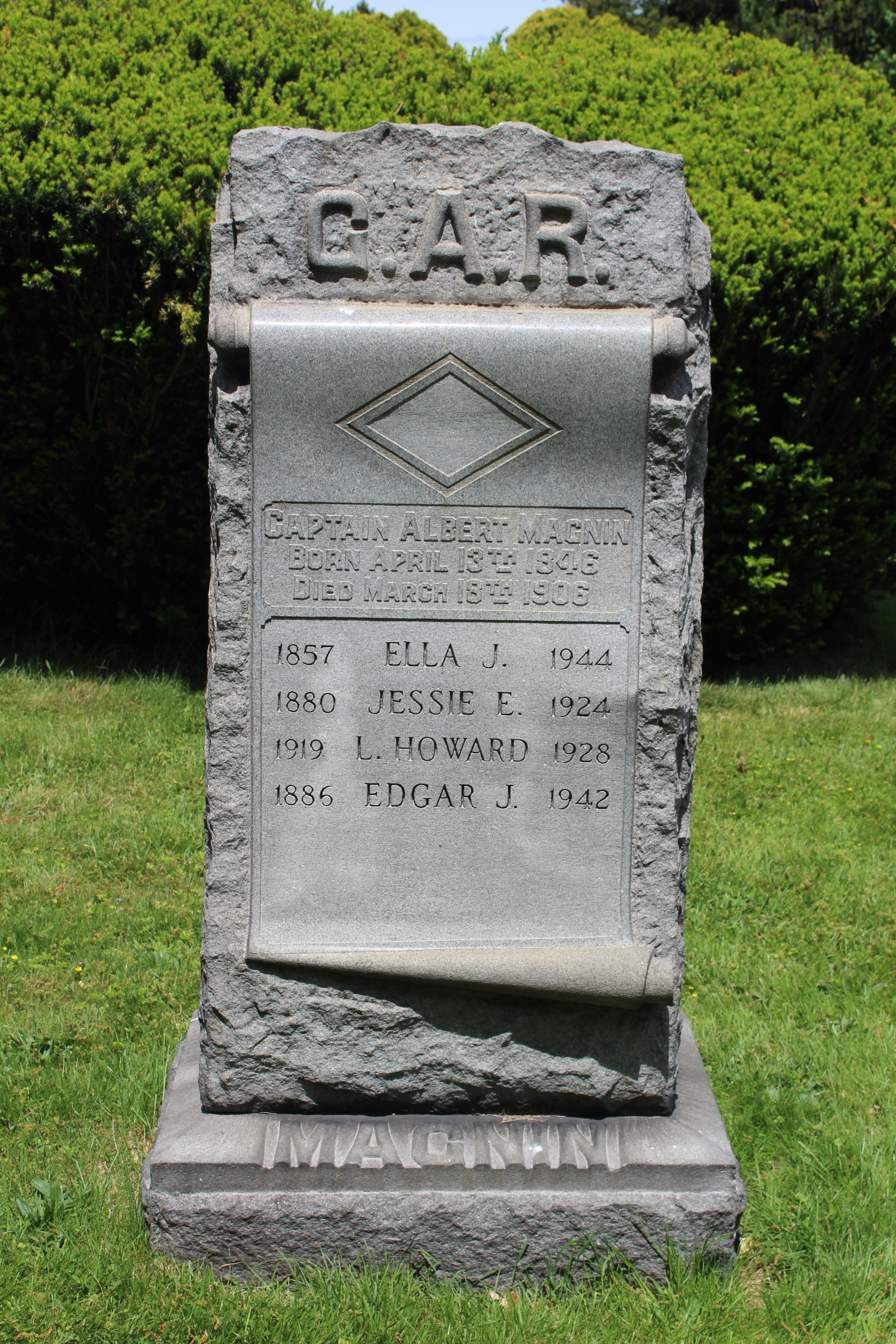
Albert Magnin Gravestone in Arlington Cemetery, Drexel Hill, Pennsylvania

== Early life and military service ==
Magnin was born in Philadelphia, Pennsylvania. He served in the Pennsylvania Volunteer Infantry division during the U.S. Civil War in the following capacities:

- Sergeant, Company D, 26th Regiment from 1861-1864
- Sergeant, Company C, 99th Regiment from 1864-1865
- Second Lieutenant, Company F, 203rd Regiment in 1865

On September 11, 1889, Captain Magnin was the keynote speaker at the dedication of a regimental monument for the 99th Pennsylvania Infantry at the portion of the Gettysburg battlefield known as the Devil's Den.

== Career ==
Magnin worked as a farmer and as editor and proprietor of the Darby Progress newspaper.

He was elected to the Pennsylvania House of Representatives for Delaware County and served from 1889 to 1892.

Magnin served as Postmaster for the United States Postal Service in Darby, Pennsylvania from 1900 to 1906.

== Personal life ==
Magnin was married to Ellen Jane (Fielding) Magnin and together they had 4 sons and 3 daughters. He died in Darby, Pennsylvania and was interred at the Arlington Cemetery in Drexel Hill, Pennsylvania.

Pennsylvania House of Representatives
Preceded by Jesse Matlack Baker	Member of the Pennsylvania House of Representatives, Delaware County; 1889–1892	Succeeded by Ward R. Bliss
