= William Garrigues Powel =

American politician

Pennsylvania House of Representatives, Delaware County
- In office 1883–1884
- Preceded by: Nathan Garrett
- Succeeded by: John Buchanan Robinson

Personal details
- Born: November 17, 1852 Delaware County, Pennsylvania
- Died: May 22, 1894 (aged 41) Concord Township, Pennsylvania
- Party: Republican

William Garrigues Powel (November 17, 1852 – May 22, 1894) was an American politician from Pennsylvania who served as a Republican member of the Pennsylvania House of Representatives for Delaware County from 1883 to 1884.

== Early life and education ==
Powel was born in Delaware County, Pennsylvania to Thomas P. and Lydia (Garrigues) Powel. He attended the Saunders Academy and Maplewood Institute.

== Career ==
Powel worked in the iron hardware and coach material business for D.H. Kent and Co. in Wilmington, Delaware and as a farmer.

Powel served for years as secretary and treasurer of the Republican Executive Committee of Delaware County and as chairman in 1880.

In 1882, he was elected to the Pennsylvania House of Representatives for Delaware County defeating Nathan Garrett. He served one term and was succeeded by John Buchanan Robinson in 1884. Powel had a second unsuccessful campaign for re-election in 1886.

== Personal life ==
Powel is interred at the St. John's Church Cemetery in Concord Township, Pennsylvania.

Pennsylvania House of Representatives
Preceded by Nathan Garrett	Member of the Pennsylvania House of Representatives, Delaware County; 1883–1884	Succeeded by John Buchanan Robinson
