= Frank Hastings Griffin =

American inventor (1886–1974)

- Born: July 16, 1886; Chester, Pennsylvania, U.S.
- Died: October 13, 1974 (aged 88); Wawa, Pennsylvania, U.S.
- Resting place: Media Cemetery, Upper Chichester Township, Pennsylvania, U.S.
- Education: Swarthmore College; Swarthmore; PA (BS); Columbia University (MS); Drexel Institute of Technology; Philadelphia, PA (Honorary Doctorate)
- Occupation: Inventor

Frank Hastings Griffin (July 16, 1886 – October 13, 1974) was an American chemist and inventor who developed the double-godet, a stretch-spinning process that created rayon from artificial silk. He served as chief chemist, general manager, vice president and as a member of the board of directors for American Viscose Corporation.

== Early life and education ==
He was born July 16, 1886, in Chester, Pennsylvania, to John and Nancy Hastings (née Mills) Grffin. He attended the Drexel Institute of Technology from 1903 to 1906 and graduated from Swarthmore College in 1910, where he was an All-American basketball player. He received his master's degree in chemical engineering from Columbia University in 1916, and an honorary doctorate from Drexel University in 1947. He taught chemistry at Hahnemann Medical School from 1909 to 1915 and at Swarthmore College.

== Career ==
Griffin worked at American Viscose Corporation from 1918 until his retirement. He developed the double-godet, a stretch-spinning process that created rayon from artificial silk. Artificial silk was originally too soft for practical use, but with the double-godet it became usable as rayon in many industrial products such as tire cords and clothing. He served as chief chemist, general manager, vice president and as a member of the board of directors for American Viscose. He also served as a director of the Southeast National Bank in Chester, the Delaware County Chamber of Commerce and the American Insulator Corp. He had four children: Adele Griffin MacCoy Sands, Frank Hastings Griffin, John Tyler Griffin, and Priscilla Griffin Schaefer.

He died on October 13, 1974, in Wawa, Pennsylvania and was interred at Media Cemetery in Upper Chichester Township, Pennsylvania.
