= Howard Malcom =

American academic administrator and minister (1799–1879)

Howard Malcolm
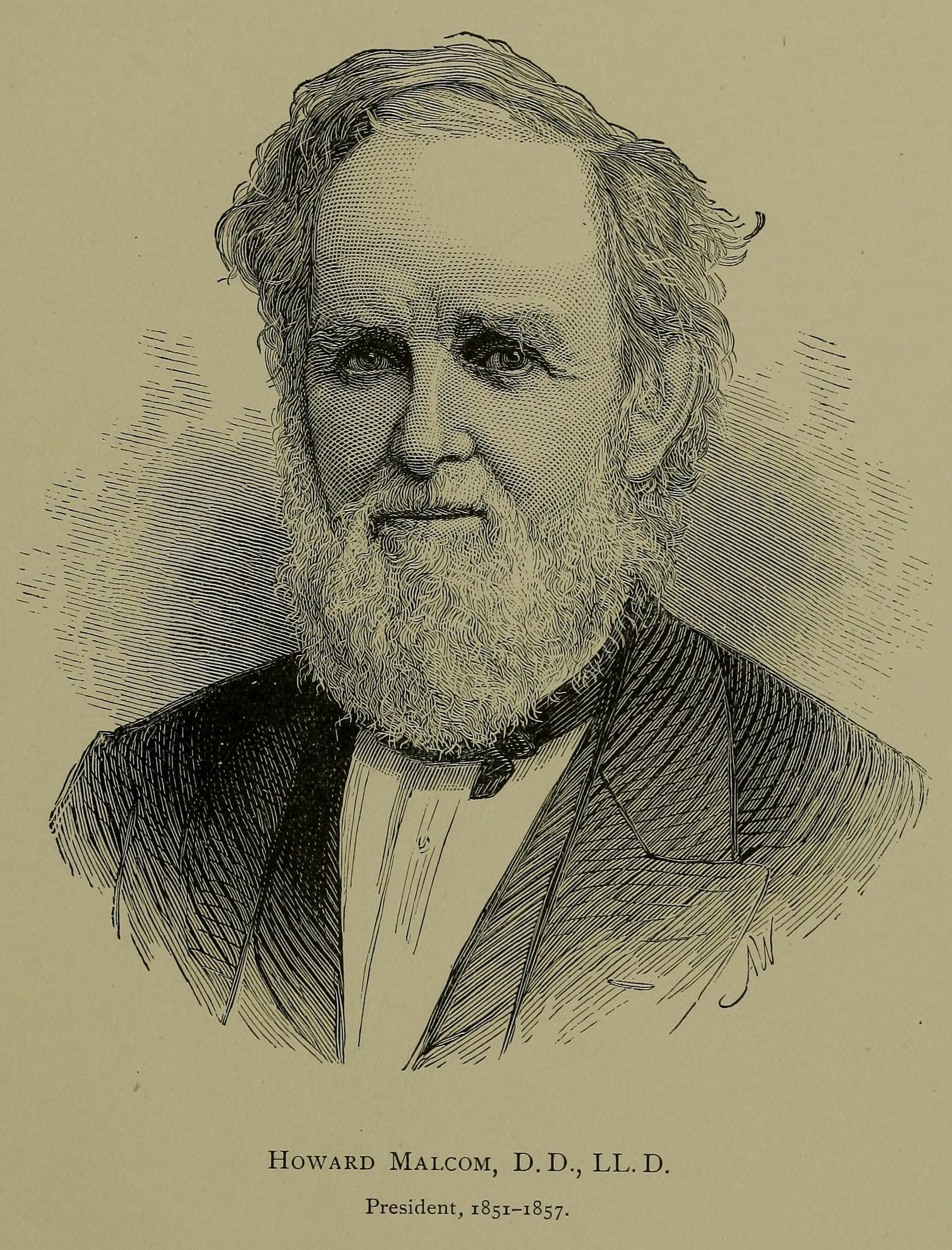

President of Drexel University College of Medicine
- In office 1874–1879

President of Bucknell University
- In office 1851–1857
- Preceded by: Stephen William Taylor
- Succeeded by: George Ripley Bliss

President of Georgetown College
- In office ?–1850

Personal details
- Born: January 19, 1799 Philadelphia, Pennsylvania, U.S.
- Died: March 25, 1879 (aged 80) Philadelphia, Pennsylvania, U.S.
- Education: Dickinson College; Princeton Theological Seminary

Howard Malcolm (January 19, 1799 – March 25, 1879) was an American educator and Baptist minister. He wrote several noteworthy works about his missionary travels in Burma and was pastor of churches in Hudson, New York, Boston, Massachusetts, and Philadelphia, Pennsylvania. He also served as president of Georgetown College, Bucknell University and Drexel University College of Medicine.

== Early life ==
He was born on January 19, 1799, in Philadelphia, Pennsylvania, to John J. and Deborah Howard Malcolm. He attended Dickinson College and Princeton Theological Seminary.

== Career ==
Malcolm was pastor of three Baptist churches: the first in Hudson, New York (1820–1826), Federal Street Baptist Church in Boston (1827–1835) and Sansom Street Baptist Church in Philadelphia (1849–1851). In 1835, he went on his own missions to India, Burma, Siam, China, and Africa. He wrote some valuable literature about his missionary travels, notably, in 1839, Travels in South-Eastern Asia, embracing Hindustan, Malaya, Siam, and China, and in 1840, Travels in the Burman Empire. In 1843, mainly due to these writings, he received Doctorates of Divinity from Union College and University of Vermont.

Due to loss of his voice, he was required to give up preaching. Later, he became President at Georgetown College in Kentucky until he resigned in 1850, and of the University at Lewisburg in Pennsylvania (later, Bucknell University). From 1874 to 1879, Malcom served as President of Hahnemann Medical College (now Drexel University College of Medicine) in Philadelphia.

== Death ==
At the age of eighty, he died in Philadelphia on March 25, 1879.
