= Tasker H. Bliss =

8th Chief of Staff of the United States Army (1917-1918)

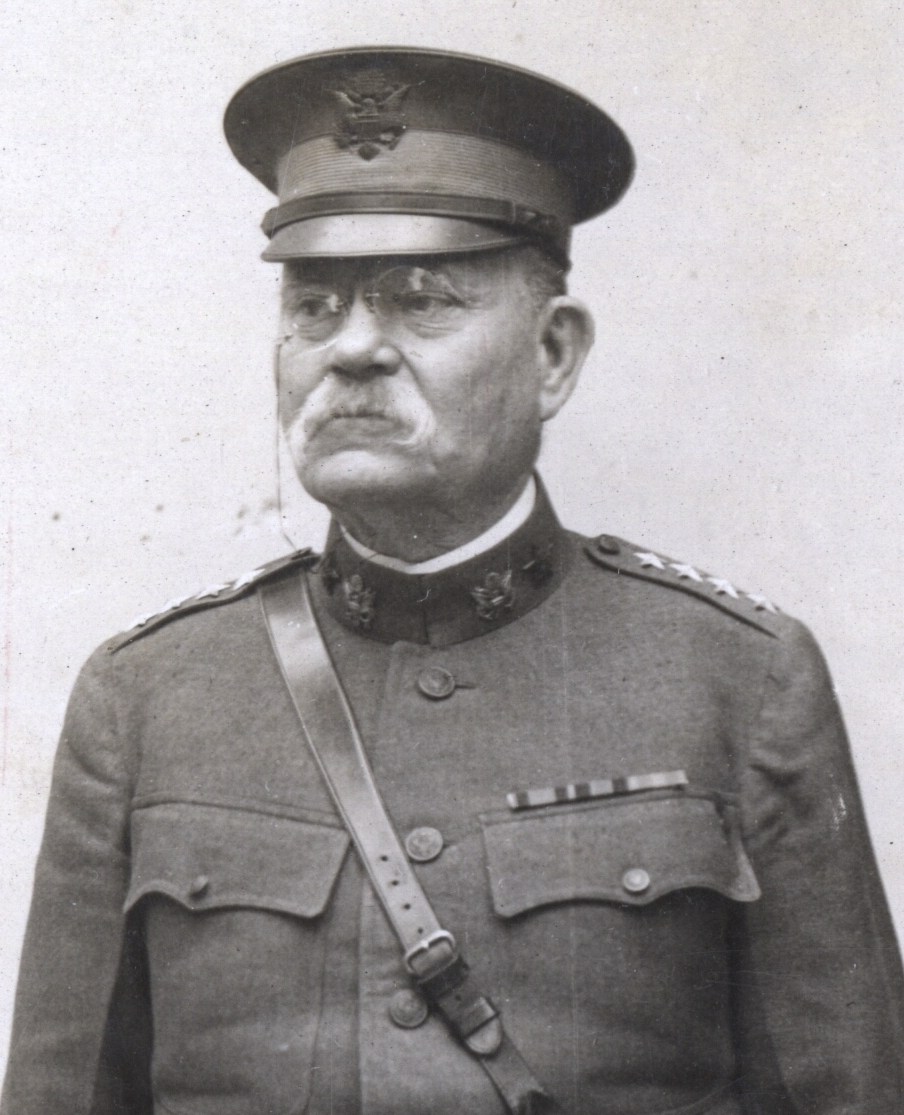
- General Tasker H. Bliss in May 1918 during World War I.
- Born: December 31, 1853; Lewisburg, Pennsylvania, U.S.
- Died: November 9, 1930 (aged 76); Washington, D.C., U.S.
- Burial place: Arlington National Cemetery, Virginia, United States
- Relatives: George Ripley Bliss (father); Ward R. Bliss (brother)
- Military career
- Allegiance: United States
- Branch: United States Army
- Service years: 1875–1920
- Rank: General
- Service number: 0-12990
- Commands: Chief of Staff of the United States Army; Department of the South; Department of the East; Department of California; United States Army War College; Department of Luzon; Department of Mindanao; Moro Province; Philippine Division
- Conflicts: Spanish–American War; Philippine–American War; World War I
- Awards: Army Distinguished Service Medal

Tasker Howard Bliss (December 31, 1853 – November 9, 1930) was a United States Army officer who served as Chief of Staff of the United States Army during World War I, from September 22, 1917, until May 18, 1918. He was also a diplomat involved in the peace negotiations of the war, and was one of the co-signatories of the Treaty of Versailles for the United States.

== Early life ==
Tasker Howard Bliss was born in Lewisburg, Pennsylvania, to George Ripley Bliss and Mary Ann (née Raymond) Bliss. He attended Bucknell (then Lewisburg) University for one year. He was a member of Phi Kappa Psi fraternity before entering the United States Military Academy (USMA) at West Point, New York. At the USMA, he excelled in languages, mathematics, and tactics and graduated eighth in his class on 16 June 1875.

== Military career ==
Upon graduation, Bliss was commissioned a second lieutenant in the 1st Artillery and performed routine garrison duties in Georgia and New York. On 14 September 1876, he was appointed to the USMA as an assistant professor of French until 1882. While assigned to the USMA, he was promoted to first lieutenant.

Bliss married Eleanora Emma Anderson on 24 May 1882. In late 1882, he was assigned to Fort Mason, California, and Fort Monroe, Virginia. Their first child, Eleanora, was born on July 15, 1883. In 1885, he was an instructor at the Naval War College where he was sent to England, Germany, and France to study their military schools. The purpose of the trip was to determine if United States military schools were teaching similar and relevant material. He returned to the United States and on 16 May 1888, he was assigned to be aide-de-camp to U.S. Army Commanding General John M. Schofield. A concurrent assignment while aide-de-camp was Inspector of Artillery and Small Arms. During this time, the Blisses' son, Edward Goring Bliss, was born in June 1892.

On 20 December 1892, while aide-de-camp, he was promoted to captain, staff, Commissary of Subsistence and on 26 September 1895 he was assigned to special duty at the office of the Secretary of War. On 4 March 1897, he was assigned as the Quartermaster and Commissary at Fort Monroe, Virginia. On 2 July 1897, he was sent to Spain as the military attaché to the United States Legation. When war was declared between Spain and the United States, Captain Bliss was ordered to return to the U.S., via Paris, on 21 April 1898.

=== Spanish–American War ===
On 30 April 1898, Bliss was promoted to major, Staff, Commissary of Subsistence and on 9 May to lieutenant colonel and Chief, Commissary of Subsistence, U.S. Volunteers. Bliss was then assigned to the 6th Army Corps as Chief Commissary, 23 May 1898, and then Camp George H. Thomas, in Chickamauga, Georgia, until ordered to Santiago, Cuba, and then Puerto Rico on 20 July 1898. Colonel Bliss arrived in Ponce, Puerto Rico, in early August and was appointed as the chief of staff, 1st Division, I Army Corps, under Major General James H. Wilson. Concurrent assignments included being a board member to select camp sites in Cuba and chief commissary of the I Army Corps.

=== Time in Cuba ===
Bliss was ordered to Havana, Cuba on 15 December 1898, as Collector of Customs for the Island of Cuba and the Port of Havana. On 13 June 1899 Bliss received an honorable discharge from the U.S. Volunteers and returned to the Regular Army. While serving as Chief, Collector of Customs for the Island of Cuba and the Port of Havana he was also the President of the commission to Revise the Cuban Tariff Treaty in 1901 and was appointed to the Army War College Board as Special Envoy to Cuba to negotiate the treaty ratification in November and December 1902. The Treaty was ratified and signed on 17 December 1903.

In 1900, Bliss was elected as a veteran companion of the Pennsylvania Commandery of the Military Order of Foreign Wars.

=== Senior command ===
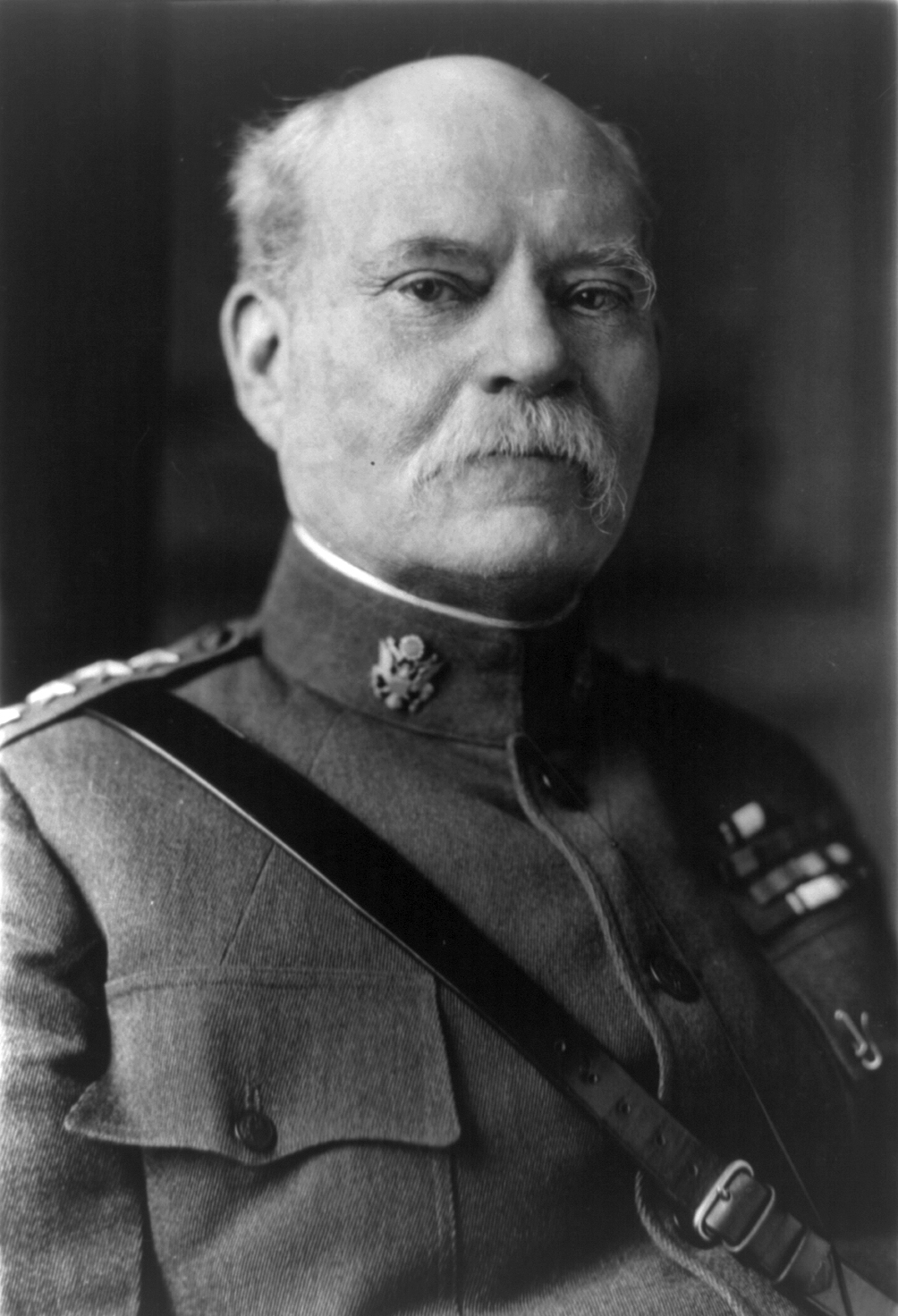
General Tasker Bliss c. 1910s

Bliss was commissioned as a brigadier general in the Regular Army by an Act of Congress under direction of the U.S. President Theodore Roosevelt. On 15 August 1903, Bliss was appointed a member of the General Staff, Chief, 3rd Division and President of the Army War College. In September 1904, he participated in the Manassas maneuvers in Virginia.

On 7 June 1905, Bliss was ordered the Philippine Islands to command the Department of Luzon. On 9 January 1906, he was assigned as commander of the Department of Mindanao, commanding U.S. troops in the Moro Rebellion. On 16 April 1906, Bliss assumed the office of governor for Moro Province after its previous governor, General Leonard Wood was forced to resign due to the controversy surrounding the First Battle of Bud Dajo. While still governor of Moro province, Bliss was ordered to command the Philippine Division on 14 December 1908. He relinquished all Philippine Islands commands on 6 April 1909, and returned to the U.S. after touring China and Manchuria.

Bliss was assigned to the general staff and president of the U.S. Army War College, 19 June 1909. On 12 August 1910, he was assigned to command the Department of California, in San Francisco, California. On 13 August 1911, he was assigned as Commander, Department of the East, Fort Totten, New York, and subsequently assigned to Commander, Department of the South, Fort Sam Houston, San Antonio, Texas on 26 February 1913.

=== World War I and Paris Peace Conference ===
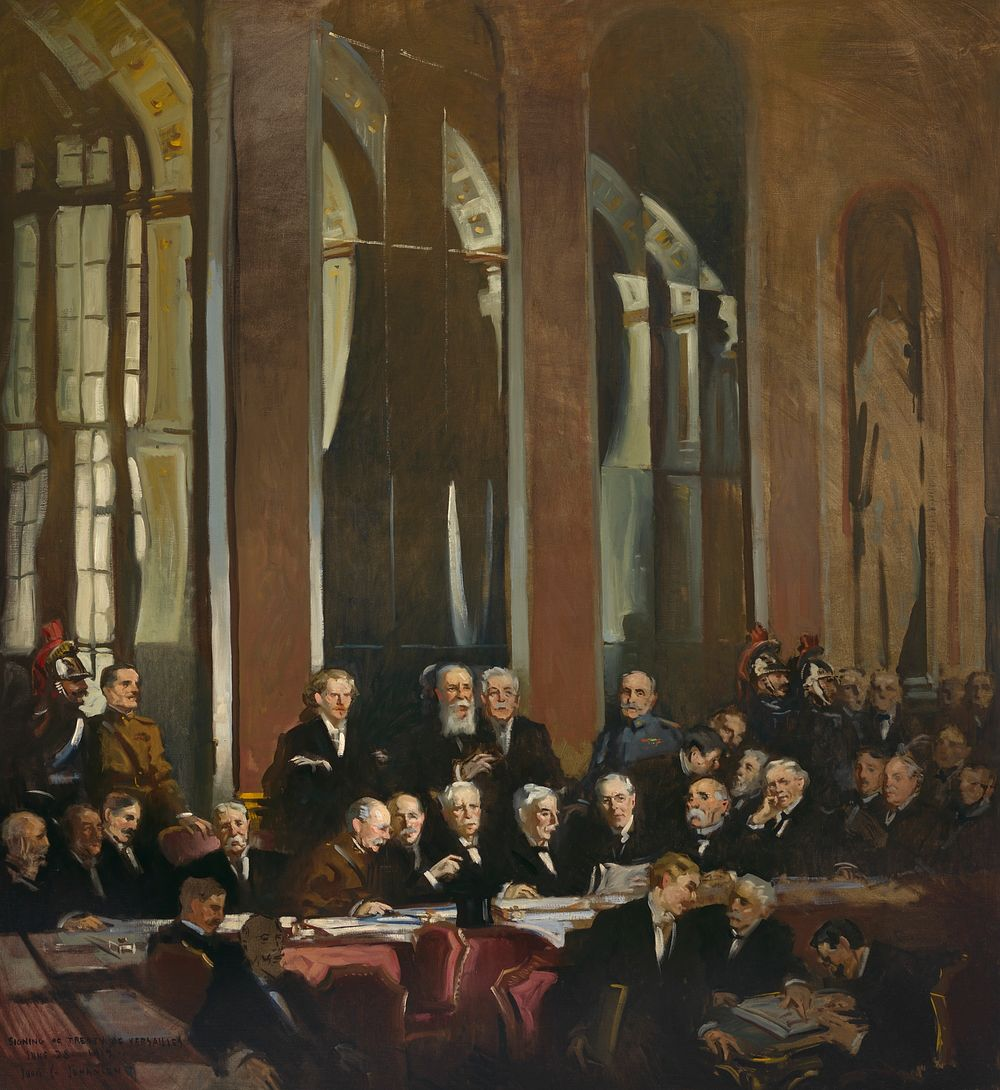
The delegation of the United States (centered: John J. Pershing, General Tasker H. Bliss, President Woodrow Wilson, Edward Mandell House, Henry White, Robert Lansing) signing the Treaty of Versailles in 1919. – National Portrait Gallery, Washington, DC, Smithsonian Institution, NPG.65.83, oil on canvas from John Christen Johansen.

On 13 February 1915, Bliss was detailed to the general staff as Assistant Chief of Staff, Army until his promotion to chief of staff on 22 September 1917. He was promoted to major general in the Regular Army on 20 November 1915 and received a temporary promotion to full general (four star) in the National Army on 6 October 1917, exactly six months after the American entry into World War I. On 17 November 1917, he was assigned as the American Permanent Military Representative, Supreme War Council, concurrent with the U.S. Army Chief of Staff position.

Bliss was forced to retire due to age limitations on 31 December 1917, but by order of President Woodrow Wilson, was recalled to active duty on 1 January 1918 and sent to Versailles, France, on 23 January to better carry out his duties on the Supreme War Council. He was relieved as U.S. Army Chief of Staff on 19 May 1918, and returned to his permanent rank of major general (retired) 20 May 1918. After the signing of the armistice ending World War I, on 11 November 1918, Bliss held two titles, the American Permanent Military Representative, Supreme War Council, and also, Plenipotentiary at the Paris Peace Conference. This assignment was concluded on 10 December 1919.

For his services during the war Bliss was awarded with the Army Distinguished Service Medal, the citation for which reads:

The President of the United States of America, authorized by Act of Congress, July 9, 1918, takes pleasure in presenting the Army Distinguished Service Medal to General Tasker Howard Bliss, United States Army, for exceptionally meritorious and distinguished services to the Government of the United States, in a duty of great responsibility during World War I, in his most exceptional services as Assistant Chief of Staff, acting Chief of Staff, and Chief of Staff of the U.S. Army, in which important positions his administrative ability and professional attainments were of great value to our armies. As Chief of the American section of the Supreme War Council, General Bliss has taken an important part in the shaping of the policies that have brought victory to our cause.

== Later life ==
On 1 May 1920, Bliss was released from active duty and was appointed as governor of the U.S. Soldiers Home in Washington, DC. He retired from that position on 1 May 1927. He was promoted to full general on the retired list on 21 June 1930.

He died on 9 November 1930 and is buried in Arlington National Cemetery.

== Family ==
His brother was Pennsylvania state representative Ward R. Bliss. Edward Goring Bliss was the son of Tasker and Eleanor E. Bliss. Born on 2 June 1892, he graduated from the USMA in 1916 and was commissioned a 2nd Lieutenant in the Engineer Corps. He saw service in Siberia in 1918–1919 and through World War II. He retired with the rank of lieutenant colonel.

His daughter Eleanora, born in 1885, attended Bryn Mawr College where she became one of the first women to gain a doctorate in geology. She joined the United States Geological Survey where she met and married fellow geologist, Adolph Knopf.

== Legacy ==
The U.S. Navy transports USS Tasker H. Bliss (AP-42) and USS General T. H. Bliss (AP-131) were named after him.

A portrait of General Bliss hangs in Luce Hall at the United States Naval War College.

Contrary to popular belief, Fort Bliss, Texas is not named after him. Fort Bliss is named for Lieutenant Colonel William Wallace Smith Bliss, a veteran of the Mexican War.

== Dates of rank ==
Insignia	Rank	Component	Date
None	Cadet	United States Military Academy	1 September 1871
None in 1875	Second lieutenant	Regular Army	16 June 1875
	First lieutenant	Regular Army	1 July 1880
	Captain	Regular Army	20 December 1892
	Major	Regular Army	30 April 1898
	Lieutenant colonel	Volunteers	9 June 1898 (Date of rank was 9 May 1898.)
	Major	Regular Army	13 June 1899 (Reverted to permanent rank to date from 30 April 1898.)
	Brigadier general	Volunteers	7 May 1901 (Date of rank was 26 April 1901.)
	Major	Regular Army	20 June 1901 (Reverted to permanent rank to date from 30 April 1898.)
	Brigadier general	Regular Army	21 July 1902
	Major general	Regular Army	20 November 1915
	General	National Army	8 October 1917 (Date of rank was 6 October 1917.)
	Major general	Retired list	1 January 1918 (Remained on active duty as chief of staff with rank of general until 20 May 1918.)
	Brevet general	Retired list	20 May 1918 (Remained on active duty as permanent major general with brevet to general.)
	Major general	Retired list	1 May 1920
	General	Retired list	21 June 1930

Bliss never held the rank of colonel. He was promoted to brigadier general from major by an act of Congress at the President's request.

Bliss also never held the rank of lieutenant general. He was appointed a general by the U.S. president under U.S. Code, Title 10, Subtitle A, Part I, Chapter 6, § 164, which provided for the Chief of Staff of the Army to serve with the rank of general.

== Orders, decorations and medals ==
Army Distinguished Service Medal
Spanish Campaign Medal
Philippine Campaign Medal
Army of Cuban Occupation Medal
Mexican Border Service Medal
World War I Victory Medal
Knight Grand Cross of the Order of St Michael and St George (UK)
Grand Croix Légion d'Honneur (France)
Grand Cross Order of the Crown (Belgium)
Grand Cross Order of Saints Maurice and Lazarus (Italy)
Grand Cordon Order of the Rising Sun (Japan)
Polonia Restituta (Poland)
War Merit Cross (Italy)
Medal of Solidarity, 1918 (Panama)

== Other honors ==
- Honorary graduate, Artillery School, 1884.
- Honorary Doctor of Laws, Bucknell University, 1916
- Honorary Doctor of Laws, Western Reserve University, 1923
- Honorary Doctor of Military Science, Pennsylvania Military College, 1925
- Honorary Doctor of Laws, Harvard University, 1927

== See also ==
- Peyton C. March
- John J. Pershing

Military offices
Preceded by Hugh L. Scott	Chief of Staff of the United States Army; 1917–1918	Succeeded by Peyton C. March
