= Crosby M. Black =

American politician (1866–1916)

Mayor of Chester, Pennsylvania
- In office 1896–1899
- Preceded by: John B. Hinkson
- Succeeded by: Dr. Daniel W. Jeffris

Member of the Pennsylvania House of Representatives from Delaware County district
- In office 1905–1906
- Preceded by: Ward R. Bliss
- Succeeded by: Samuel Dyer Clyde

Personal details
- Born: June 15, 1866 Chester, Pennsylvania, U.S.
- Died: November 16, 1916 (aged 50)
- Resting place: Media Cemetery, Upper Providence Township, Pennsylvania, U.S.
- Party: Republican

Crosby Morton Black (June 25, 1866 – November 16, 1916) was an American politician from Pennsylvania who served as a Republican member of the Pennsylvania House of Representatives for Delaware County from 1905 to 1906. He also served as mayor of Chester, Pennsylvania from 1896 to 1899.

== Early life and education ==
Black was born in Chester, Pennsylvania to J. Frank and Sue C. (Morton) Black.

== Career ==
Black entered into partnership with Morton & Black, a lumber, coal, saw and planing mill business run by his father J. Frank Black, his uncle Henry B. Black and grandfather Crosby P. Morton. His uncle Henry B. Black retired and the name of the business was changed to Morton, Black & Son and then again to J. Frank Black & Son.

In 1891, the business was merged into Chester Lumber & Coal and Black became the treasurer and general manager. He was also involved in real estate and insurance.

Black incorporated the Morton Crosby Company to manufacture foundry and filter supplies.

He was elected president of the Chester City Council and mayor of Chester from 1896 to 1899.

Black was the owner of the Morning Republican newspaper.

Black was elected to the Pennsylvania House of Representative by special election on February 21, 1905 after Ward R. Bliss died in office.

== Personal life ==
Black married Mary Phoebe and together they had four children.

He is interred at the Media Cemetery in Upper Providence Township, Pennsylvania.

== See also ==
- List of mayors of Chester, Pennsylvania

Political offices
Preceded by John B. Hinkson	Mayor of Chester, Pennsylvania; 1896–1899	Succeeded by Dr. Daniel W. Jeffris
Pennsylvania House of Representatives
Preceded by Ward R. Bliss	Member of the Pennsylvania House of Representatives, Delaware County; 1905–1906	Succeeded by Samuel Dyer Clyde
