= Ward R. Bliss =

American politician (1855–1905)

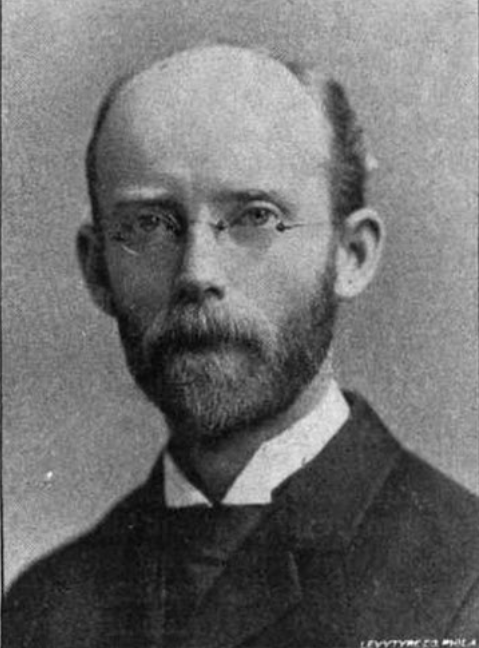
- Bliss in a 1893 publication

Member of the Pennsylvania House of Representatives from the Delaware County district
- In office 1889–1905
- Preceded by: Albert Magnin
- Succeeded by: Crosby M. Black

Personal details
- Born: December 15, 1855 Lewisburg, Pennsylvania, U.S.
- Died: January 6, 1905 (aged 49) Philadelphia, Pennsylvania, U.S.
- Resting place: Lewisburg Cemetery, Lewisburg, Pennsylvania, U.S.
- Party: Republican
- Parent: George Ripley Bliss (father)
- Relatives: Tasker H. Bliss (brother)
- Occupation: Politician; lawyer

Ward Raymond Bliss (December 15, 1855 - January 6, 1905) was an American politician from Pennsylvania who served as a Republican member of the Pennsylvania House of Representatives for Delaware County from 1889 to 1906 and as Majority Leader from 1903 to 1904.

== Early life and education ==
Ward Raymond Bliss was born on December 15, 1855, in Lewisburg, Pennsylvania, to George Ripley Bliss. He graduated from Bucknell University in 1874 and was a member of the Sigma Chi fraternity.

== Career ==
In 1874, Bliss moved to Chester, Pennsylvania. He worked as a teacher while studying law and was admitted to the Delaware County bar in 1878.

In 1881, Bliss began publishing a weekly legal journal, of which 5 volumes were published in book form under the title "The Delaware County Reports". He also published a "Digest of the Local Laws of Delaware County".

In 1882, Bliss became owner and editor of the Delaware County Republican newspaper in Chester and continued in that capacity until 1893. He was an incorporator of the Cumberland Telephone Company, later renamed the United Telephone Company. He worked as general counsel for the United Telephone Company. He had a law partnership with A. B. Geary.

He worked as chair of the Delaware County Republican Committee in 1887 and was elected to the Pennsylvania House of Representatives for Delaware County defeating Albert Magnin in 1889. Bliss was re-elected to serve eight consecutive terms, served as chairman of the committee of appropriations and as Majority Leader from 1903-1904.

Bliss died in office and his vacancy was filled by Crosby M. Black.

== Personal life ==
Bliss did not marry. His brothers were Robert E. Bliss, Tasker H. Bliss and H. H. Bliss.

Bliss died following hospitalization for pneumonia in Philadelphia, Pennsylvania, and is interred at the Lewisburg Cemetery in Lewisburg, Pennsylvania.

Pennsylvania House of Representatives
Preceded by Albert Magnin	Member of the Pennsylvania House of Representatives, Delaware County; 1889–1905	Succeeded by Crosby M. Black
