= Media Cemetery =

Historic cemetery in Delaware County, Pennsylvania

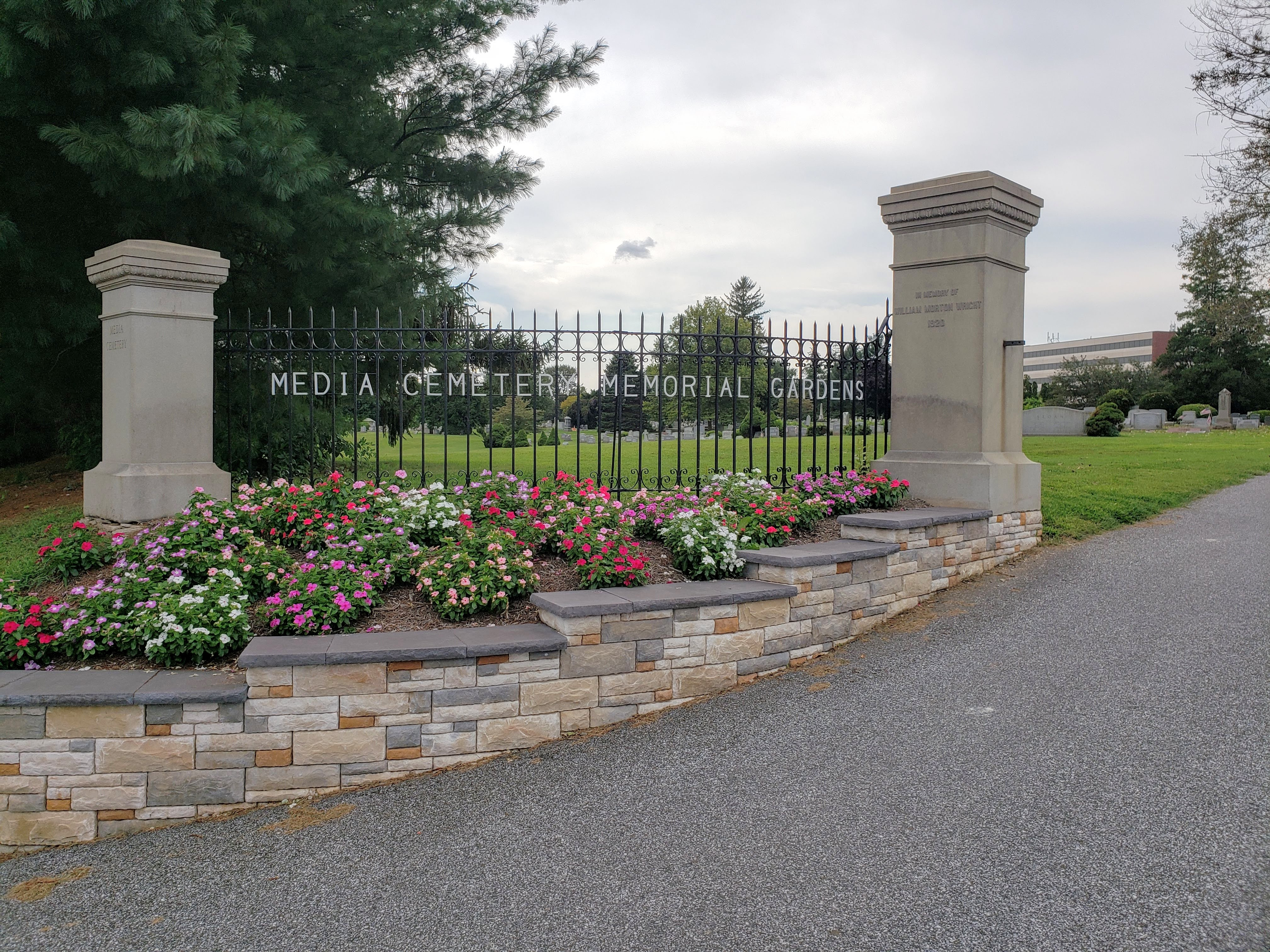
- Media Cemetery Gates
- Interactive map of Media Cemetery

Details
- Location: 40 Kirk Lane, Upper Providence Township, Pennsylvania
- Country: United States
- Coordinates: 39.93283°N 75.39398°W
- Type: Public
- Size: 21 acres (0.085 km^{2})
- Find a Grave: Media Cemetery

Media Cemetery is a historic cemetery established in 1857 in Upper Providence Township, Pennsylvania. It is located at 40 Kirk Lane and is 21 acres in size. In 1928, the cemetery merged with the adjacent West Media Cemetery and became a non-profit entity.

== Notable burials ==
- Jesse Matlack Baker (1854–1913), Pennsylvania State Representative and Senator
- Crosby M. Black (1866–1916), Pennsylvania State Representative
- Anna Broomall (1847–1931), obstetrician, surgeon and educator
- John Martin Broomall (1816–1894), U.S. Congressman
- Frank Hastings Griffin (1886–1974), chemical engineer and inventor
- Orson Flagg Bullard (1834–1906), Pennsylvania State Representative
- Thomas Valentine Cooper (1835–1909), Pennsylvania State Representative and Senator
