= John Buchanan Robinson =

American politician

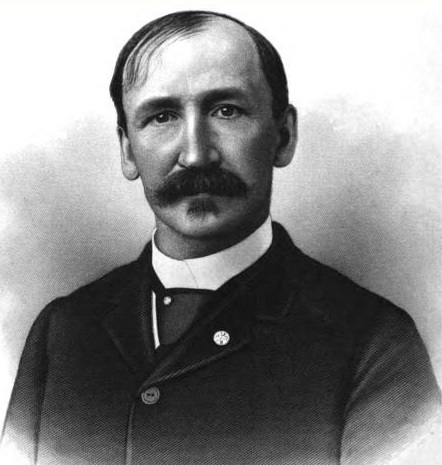

Member of the U.S. House of Representatives from Pennsylvania's 6th district
- In office March 4, 1891 – March 3, 1897
- Preceded by: Smedley Darlington
- Succeeded by: Thomas S. Butler

Pennsylvania House of Representatives, Delaware County
- In office 1884–1888
- Preceded by: William Garrigues Powel
- Succeeded by: Jesse Matlack Baker

Pennsylvania State Senate, 9th district
- In office 1889–1892
- Preceded by: Thomas Valentine Cooper
- Succeeded by: Jesse Matlack Baker

Personal details
- Born: May 23, 1846 Allegheny City, Pennsylvania, U.S.
- Died: January 28, 1933 (aged 86) Philadelphia, Pennsylvania, U.S.
- Party: Republican
- Spouse: Elizabeth Waddington

John Buchanan Robinson (May 23, 1846 – January 28, 1933) was an American politician from Pennsylvania who served as a Republican member of the Pennsylvania House of Representatives for Delaware County from 1884 to 1888, the Pennsylvania State Senate for the 9th district from 1889 to 1892 and the U.S. House of Representatives for Pennsylvania's 6th congressional district from 1891 to 1897.

== Early life and education ==
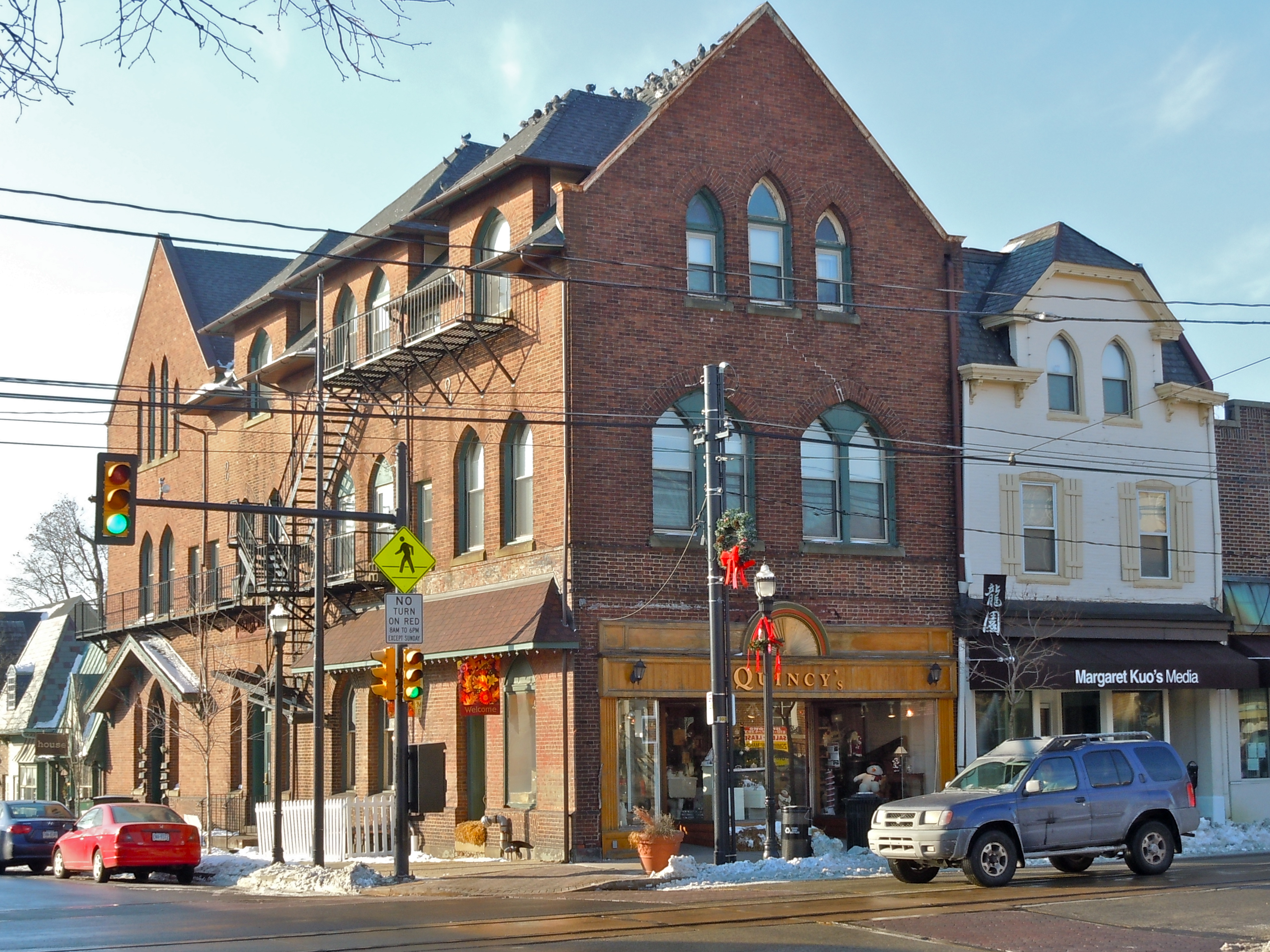
The Ledger Building, home of the Media Ledger, built 1895

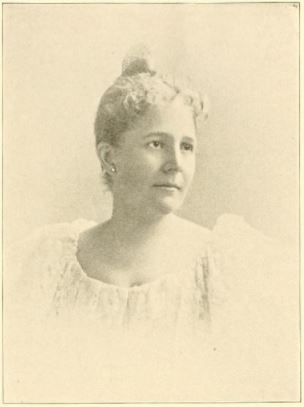
Elizabeth Robinson

Robinson was born in Allegheny City, Pennsylvania and was the grandson of the politician, businessman and militia general William Robinson, Jr.

He attended private schools in Pittsburgh, entered the University of Pittsburgh and finished at Amherst College. He enlisted in the Union Army in 1864, however the Robinson family already had two sons at the front in the American Civil War and used the influence of his grandfather William Robinson, Jr. to have John released from service against his wishes. As compensation, he was appointed a cadet at the United States Naval Academy in Annapolis, Maryland by Congressman Thomas Williams and graduated in 1868. He was commissioned a Lieutenant and circumnavigated the globe on the USS Colorado. He was a member of the second U.S. party to be granted an audience before the Emperor of Japan.

In 1873, Robinson returned to the U.S. and served on the USS Michigan on the Great Lakes. He also served on the USS Juniata when it sailed to Santiago de Cuba to demand the release of American citizens seized on the Virignius by Spanish authorities.

He resigned from the Navy in 1875 and moved to Delaware County, Pennsylvania. He studied law under John G. Johnson and was admitted to the Philadelphia bar in 1876. In 1878, Robinson moved to Media, Pennsylvania and was admitted to the Delaware County bar. He was also admitted to practice in the Supreme Court of Pennsylvania.

He worked as editor of the Delaware County Gazette in 1881 and 1882, and as a newspaper correspondent and owner of the Media Ledger.

== Political career ==
Robinson served as a member of the Pennsylvania House of Representatives for the Delaware County district in 1884 and 1886 and to the Pennsylvania State Senate for the 9th district from 1889 to 1892.

Robinson was elected as a Republican to the Fifty-second, Fifty-third, and Fifty-fourth Congresses. He was an unsuccessful candidate for reelection in 1896.

He served as president of the League of Republican Clubs of Pennsylvania from 1891 to 1897. He was a member of the Board of Visitors to the United States Naval Academy in 1893. Robinson was also a delegate to the Republican National Conventions in 1892, 1896, and 1908.

In 1900, Robinson was appointed by President McKinley as United States marshal for the eastern district of Pennsylvania. He was reappointed in 1905 by President Theodore Roosevelt and again in 1912 by President Taft. Robinson served until 1913.

== Personal life ==
In 1874, Robinson married Elizabeth Waddington in St. Louis, Missouri and together they had seven children. Elizabeth was a granddaughter of Charles Gilpin, the Mayor of Philadelphia from 1850 to 1854. The couple met during summer vacations in Cresson, Pennsylvania.

Robinson was a member of the Independent Order of Odd Fellows, the American Protestant Association, Knights of Pythias, Order of Chosen Friends, Knights of the Golden Eagle, Improved Order of Red Men, Independent Order of Mechanics and the Bradbury Post No. 149 Grand Army of the Republic.

Robinson died in Philadelphia, Pennsylvania.

== Bibliography ==
- Robinson, John B. Midshipman to Congress. Privately Printed in Media, Pennsylvania, 1916.

Pennsylvania House of Representatives
Preceded by William Garrigues Powel	Member of the Pennsylvania House of Representatives, Delaware County; 1884–1888	Succeeded by Jesse Matlack Baker
Pennsylvania State Senate
Preceded by Thomas Valentine Cooper	Member of the Pennsylvania Senate, 9th district 1889-1892	Succeeded by Jesse Matlack Baker
U.S. House of Representatives
Preceded by Smedley Darlington	Member of the U.S. House of Representatives from Pennsylvania's 6th congressional district 1891–1897	Succeeded by Thomas S. Butler
