= Joseph R. T. Coates =

American politician

Joseph R.T. Coates

Mayor of Chester, Pennsylvania
- In office 1887–1893
- Preceded by: Dr. J.L. Forwood
- Succeeded by: John B. Hinkson

Personal details
- Resting place: Chester Rural Cemetery, Chester, Pennsylvania, U.S.

Military service
- Allegiance: United States
- Branch/service: Union Army
- Years of service: 1861–1864
- Rank: Major
- Commands: 1st Pennsylvania Reserve Regiment
- Battles/wars: American Civil War; Battle of Mechanicsville; Battle of New Market; Second Battle of Bull Run; Battle of Antietam; Battle of Fredericksburg; Battle of Gettysburg; Battle of Bristoe Station; Battle of Bethesda Church

Joseph Ridgeway Taylor Coates (died September 21, 1921) was an American lawyer and politician from Pennsylvania who served as mayor of Chester, Pennsylvania, from 1887 to 1893. He was an officer in the Pennsylvania Reserves infantry division of the Union Army in the American Civil War and served in some of the key battles of the war.

== Military service ==
In 1861 Coates was mustered in as a 1st lieutenant to the 1st Pennsylvania Reserve Regiment, also known as the 30th Pennsylvania Volunteer Infantry, Company C. Recruited out of Chester, Company C was first known as the "Keystone Guards" and then known for a time as the "Slifer Phalanx".

Coates and Company C served at the Battle of Mechanicsville, the Battle of New Market, Second Battle of Bull Run, the Battle of Antietam, the Battle of Fredericksburg, the Battle of Gettysburg, the Battle of Bristoe Station and the Battle of Bethesda Church.

Coates was promoted from 1st lieutenant to captain in 1862 and to Major by brevet in 1864.

On June 13, 1864, Coates was mustered out with the company.

== Career ==
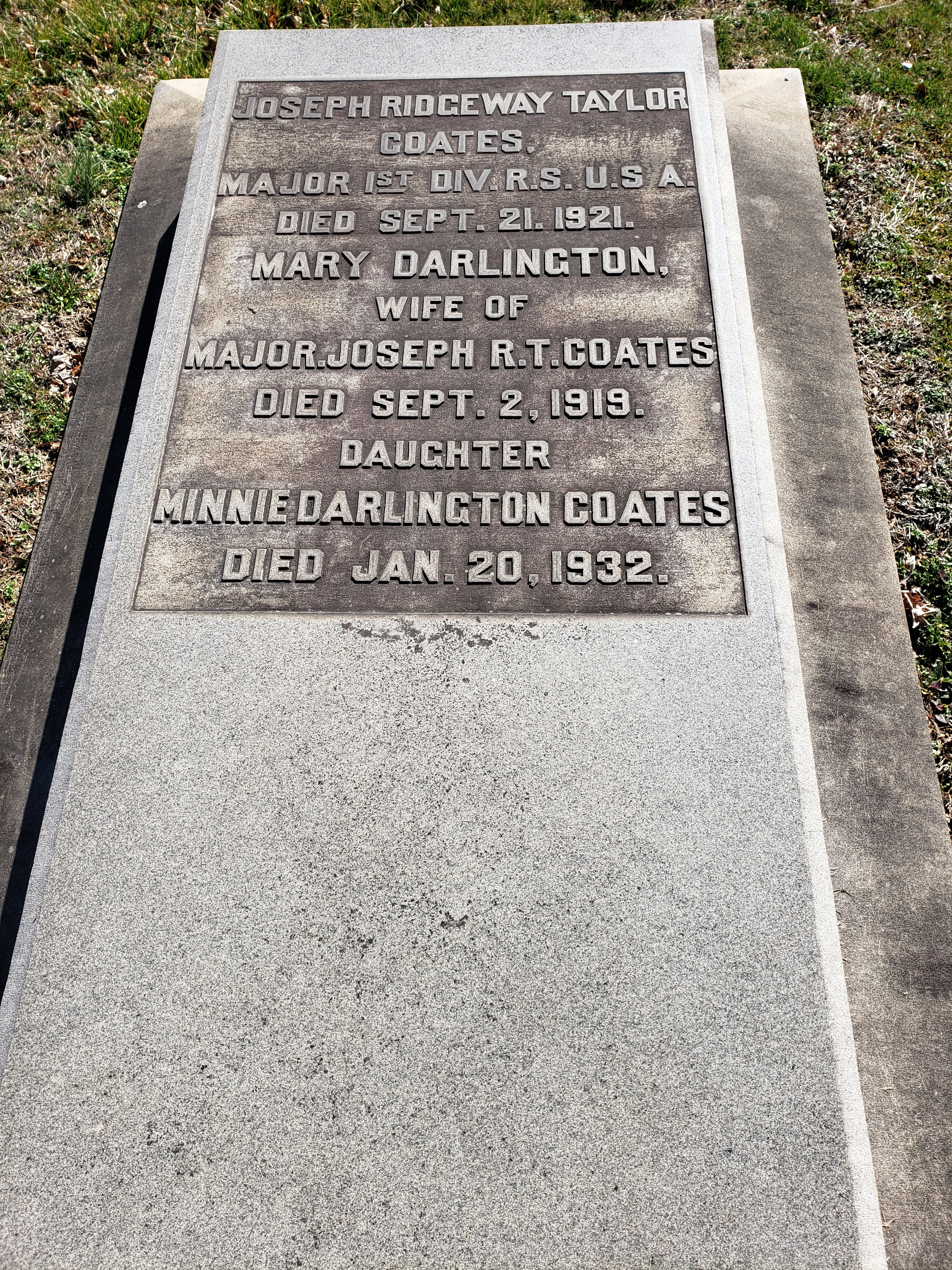
Joseph R.T. Coates gravestone in Chester Rural Cemetery

Coates was a member of the Delaware County bar. He served as Postmaster of the Chester Post Office from 1865 to 1869 and as mayor of Chester from 1887 to 1893. He was succeeded as mayor by John B. Hinkson.

He died on September 21, 1921, and was interred at Chester Rural Cemetery.

== See also ==
- List of mayors of Chester, Pennsylvania

Political offices
Preceded by Dr. J.L. Forwood	Mayor of Chester, Pennsylvania; 1887–1893	Succeeded by John B. Hinkson
