= Anna Broomall =

American physician and educator (1847–1931)

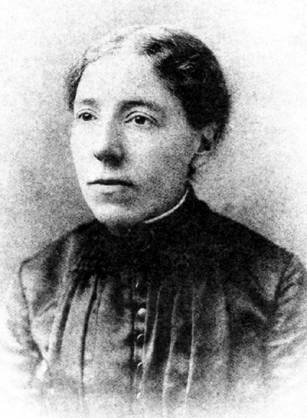
- Born: Anna Elizabeth Broomall; March 4, 1847; Upper Chichester Township, Pennsylvania, U.S.
- Died: April 4, 1931 (aged 84); Chester, Pennsylvania, U.S.
- Resting place: Media Cemetery, Upper Providence Township, Delaware County, Pennsylvania, U.S.
- Education: Woman's Medical College of Pennsylvania (MD 1871)
- Occupations: Obstetrician, surgeon, educator
- Employer: Woman's Medical College of Pennsylvania
- Known for: Founding the first outpatient maternity clinic in the USA

Anna Elizabeth Broomall (March 4, 1847 – April 4, 1931) was an American obstetrician, surgeon, and educator who taught obstetrics at the Woman's Medical College of Pennsylvania. She established the first maternal health and prenatal care clinic in the United States, located at the Woman's Hospital of Philadelphia, and used surgical innovations to reduce maternal mortality.

== Early life and education ==
Born in 1847, Broomall was raised in Upper Chichester Township, Delaware County, Pennsylvania. Her parents were John Martin Broomall, a lawyer, state representative, and future United States Congressman, and Elizabeth (Booth) Broomall. Her mother died when she was one year old, and she was raised by her aunt and uncle until her father remarried in 1853.

Educated in Pennsylvania, Broomall attended a private school in Chester, then Kennett Academy in Kennett Square, and finally the Bristol Boarding School in Bristol, graduating in 1866. A Quaker, John Martin Broomall supported women's suffrage and higher education and, when his daughter told him she intended to become a physician, simply told her to become a good one.

Broomall enrolled in the Woman's Medical College of Pennsylvania at the age of 19 and graduated with her doctor of medicine degree in 1871, choosing to repeat the two-year medical course. She worked at the college to cover the costs of her education, doing household labor such as scrubbing floors, building fires, and carrying coal. Broomall and eight other medical students were the first women to attend lectures at the Pennsylvania Hospital. Male medical students jeered, catcalled, threw spitballs, and even chased the women from the building during their first visit. However, the nine women continued to attend lectures, eventually receiving grudging toleration and even apologies from some of the men.

Broomall completed the hospital lecture series followed by a one-year internship at the Woman's Hospital of Philadelphia. She then traveled to Europe to study obstetrics under Carl Braun in Vienna and train with leading French obstetricians in Paris. She returned to Philadelphia in 1874 and accepted a position as a physician at the Woman's Hospital of Philadelphia.

== Career in medicine ==
From 1874 to 1883, Broomall was chief resident physician of the Woman's Hospital and taught concurrently at the Woman's Medical College, having been appointed an instructor of obstetrics in 1875. She became a full professor and chair of obstetrics after her mentor, Dr. Emeline Horton Cleveland, died in 1879. After leaving her full-time duties at the Woman's Hospital in 1883, Broomall established a private practice at her home on Walnut Street and worked as a gynecologist for the Friends Hospital in Frankford, Philadelphia. In 1890, she traveled to China and India to deliver lectures, inspect medical facilities, and visit former students who were serving medical missions. A beloved teacher, she continued to teach obstetrics and chair the Woman's Medical College obstetrics department until she retired from practice in 1904. She caused a stir in the spring of 1892, when she arranged mock trials of a hypothetical infanticide case, requiring students to practice presenting medical evidence to juries.

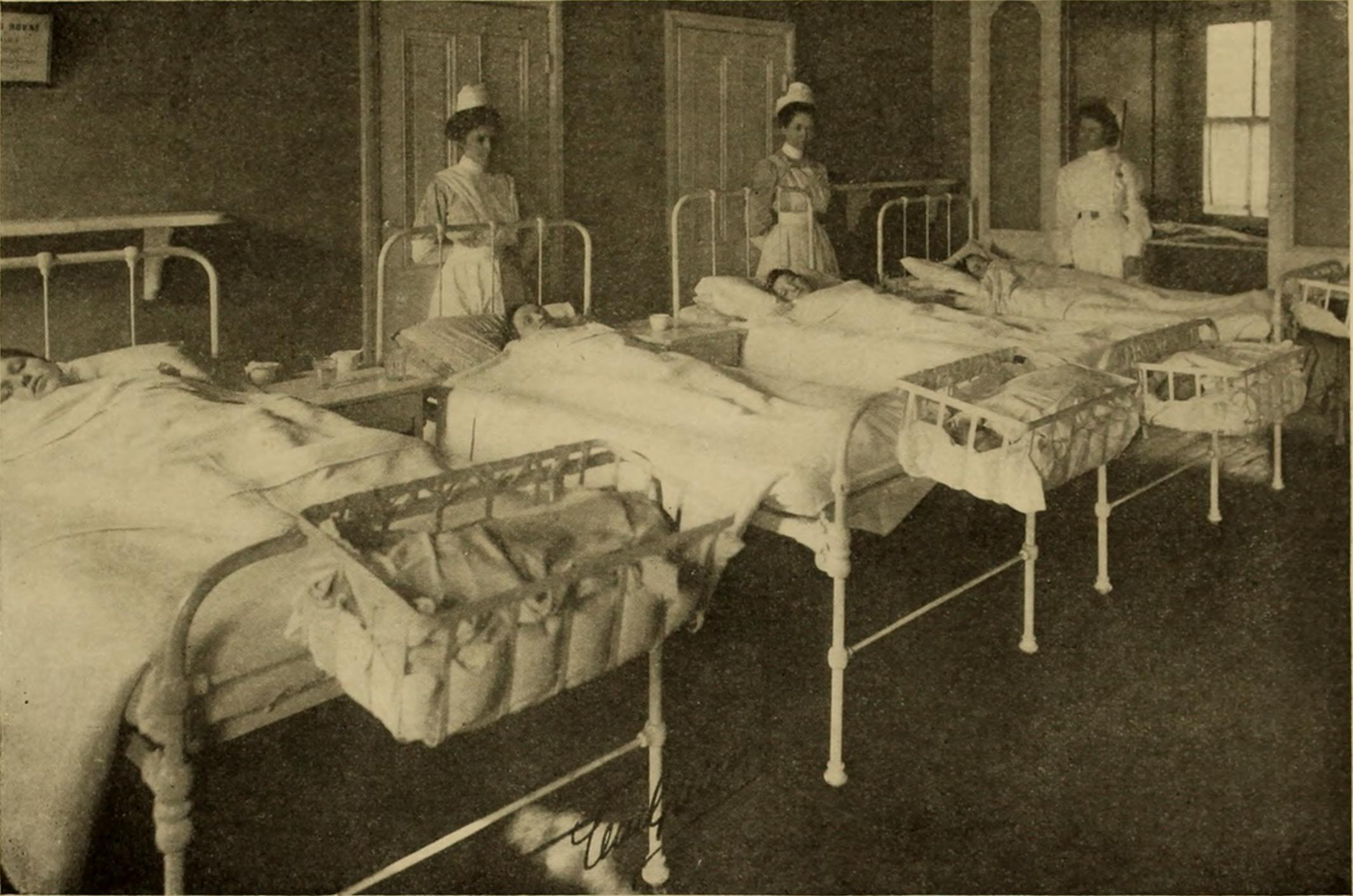
The maternity ward of the Woman's Hospital of Philadelphia circa 1911

In her thirty years as a physician and professor, Broomall implemented rigorous European-style standards for nurses' training and patient care. She implemented highly antiseptic clinical environments and utilized and improved on state-of-the-art surgical procedures such as episiotomies, cesarean sections, and symphysiotomies. Her efforts reduced mortality rates to less than one-tenth of one percent of the two thousand expectant mothers whom she treated. In January 1888, she established the first outpatient maternal health and prenatal care clinic in the United States. Part of the Woman's Hospital of Philadelphia and nicknamed South Pole, the clinic was largely staffed by medical students who cared for the predominantly working-class and Eastern and Southern European immigrants living in South Philadelphia. Her outpatient clinic evolved into a fully fledged maternity hospital, which performed nearly six thousand deliveries by 1911. After Bloomall's retirement, Dr. Alice Weld Tallant ran the clinic and chaired the obstetrics department.

Broomall was proposed for membership in 1878 and admitted to the Philadelphia Obstetrical Society in 1892. Previously, male doctors had repeatedly vetoed her membership, despite permitting a male colleague to read one of her papers at a society meeting and publishing in the society's journal, Transactions. She also published in The American Journal of Obstetrics and Diseases of Women and Children. Her students founded the Anna Broomall Society as a social and educational student club, at which medical papers were read. The club held its 27th meeting in 1927.

== Personal life and death ==
In retirement, Broomall volunteered to manage the Delaware County Historical Society's library and museum from 1923 until her death. She wrote pamphlets and collected photographs, manuscripts, and clippings that documented Delaware County's history. She donated her scrapbooks to the historical society, and they remain in the society's collections. She also joined the Delaware County Institute of Science and the Delaware County Botanical Society. She played an important role in raising community support for renovation of the historic 1724 Chester Courthouse. She was working on an unpublished manuscript on Pennsylvania witches when she died.

Broomall died on April 4, 1931, at her home in Chester, Pennsylvania, from sepsis induced by a chronic urinary tract infection. She was 84 years old. Her remains were cremated and the ashes interred in her family plot at Media Cemetery in Upper Providence Township, Pennsylvania. Broomall had never married and left no children.

== Legacy ==
The Pennsylvania Historical and Museum Commission dedicated a state historical marker in Broomall's honor on March 26, 2019. The marker is located near the house where Broomall lived in retirement, at the corner of East 13th Street and Chestnut Street in Chester, on the present-day campus of Widener University.

Historian and physician Steven Jay Peitzman described Broomall as "unquestionably among the most able of the College's nineteenth-century faculty."

== See also ==
- List of Pennsylvania state historical markers in Delaware County
