= John M. Broomall =

American politician (1816–1894)

John Martin Broomall
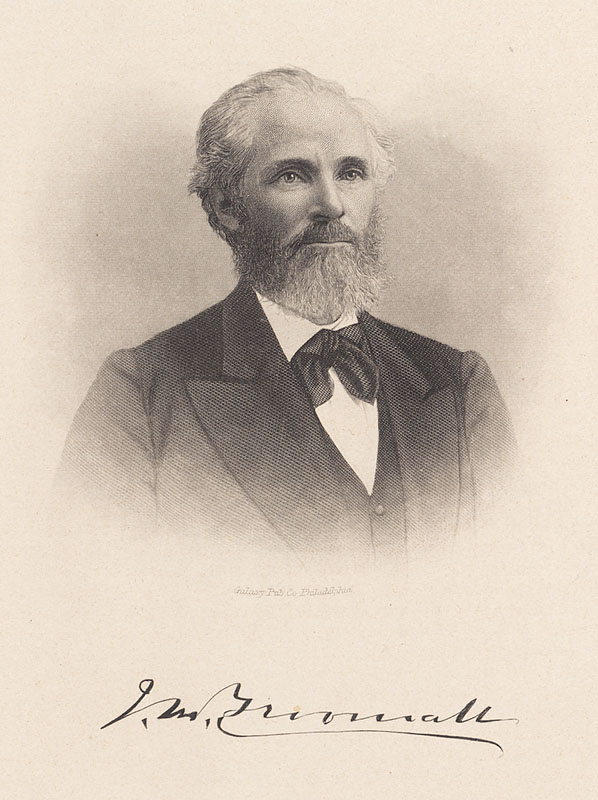

Member of the U.S. House of Representatives from Pennsylvania's 7th district
- In office March 4, 1863 – March 3, 1869
- Preceded by: John D. Stiles
- Succeeded by: Washington Townsend

Member of the Pennsylvania House of Representatives
- In office 1851-1852

Personal details
- Born: January 19, 1816 Upper Chichester Township, Pennsylvania, U.S.
- Died: June 3, 1894 (aged 78) Philadelphia, Pennsylvania, U.S.
- Resting place: Media Cemetery, Upper Providence Township, Delaware County, Pennsylvania, U.S.
- Party: Republican

John Martin Broomall (January 19, 1816 – June 3, 1894) was an American politician from Pennsylvania who served as a Republican member of the U.S. House of Representatives from Pennsylvania's 7th congressional district from 1863 to 1869. He also served as a member of the Pennsylvania House of Representatives for the Delaware County district from 1851 to 1852.

== Early life ==
John M. Broomall was born in Upper Chichester Township, Pennsylvania to John and Sarah (Martin) Broomall. He was a twin to his sister Elizabeth Martin Broomall. He attended Samuel Smith's Quaker boarding school in Wilmington, Delaware and after graduation began studying law under John Bouvier, a prominent lawyer in Philadelphia.

He continued the study of law under U.S. Congressman Samuel Edwards, was admitted to the Delaware County bar in 1840 and commenced practice in Chester, Pennsylvania.

== Career ==
In 1848, Broomall was appointed deputy attorney general for Delaware County by Attorney General Cooper.

He was a member of the Pennsylvania House of Representatives in 1851 and 1852. He served on the State revenue board in 1854. He was an unsuccessful candidate for election in 1854 and in 1858. He was a delegate to the 1860 Republican National Convention. He moved to Media, Pennsylvania, in 1860 and continued the practice of law.

Broomall served in the Union Army as Captain of Company C, Twenty-ninth Regiment, Pennsylvania Emergency Militia Infantry, from June 18 to August 1, 1863.

In 1862, Broomall was elected as a Republican to the Thirty-eighth, Thirty-ninth, and Fortieth Congresses. An active opponent of slavery, he signed the 13th amendment to the Constitution. He also advocated for a universal suffrage amendment. He served as chairman of the United States House Committee on Accounts during the Fortieth Congress. He was not a candidate for renomination in 1868.

In 1874, Broomall resumed the practice of law. He and his law partner William Ward began investing in real estate in Chester, Pennsylvania building homes in the south ward. Broomall was a delegate to the State constitutional convention. In March 1874, he was appointed President Judge of the newly created Thirty-Second Judicial District of Pennsylvania by Governor John F. Hartranft and served until January 1875, when he lost election to the position to Thomas J. Clayton.

Broomall was an originator and President of the Delaware County Mutual Insurance Company as well as the first president of the Chester Gas Company. He was elected president as the first president of the Law Library Association of the Delaware County bar and as president of the Delaware County Institute of Science.

== Personal life ==
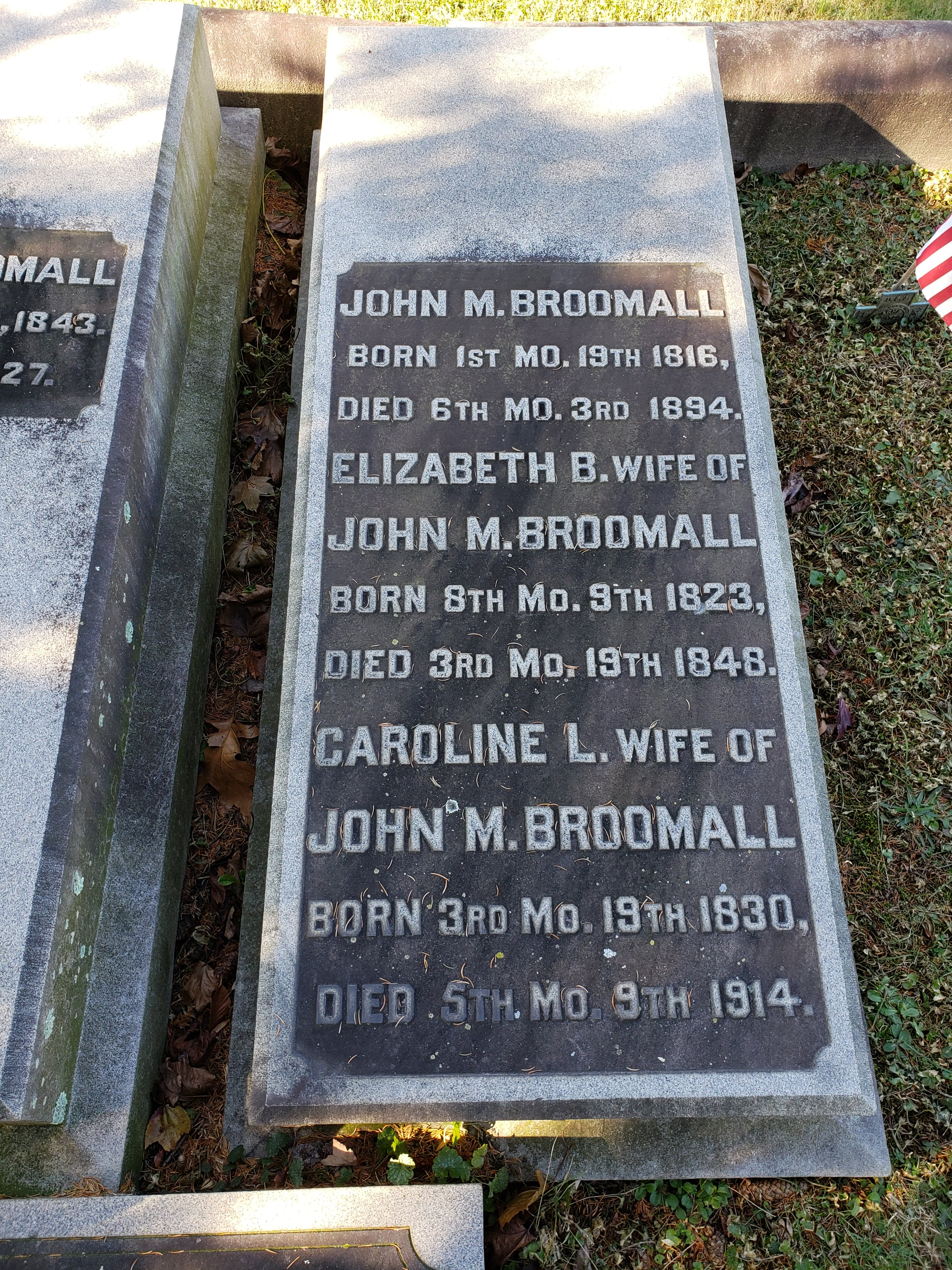
John M Broomall grave in Media Cemetery

In 1841, Broomall married Elizabeth Booth and together they had two children, including Anna Broomall who was a pioneering woman physician in Pennsylvania. Broomall was a Quaker but was "read out of meeting" for marrying Elizabeth, a non-Quaker. He was not shunned, where he could no longer attend meetings but was no longer permitted to participate in the business affairs of the meeting. Broomall was known to attend the Providence Friends Meetinghouse and regularly spoke there.

His wife Elizabeth died young and in 1852 Broomall was remarried to Caroline Larkin. Together they had an additional five children, three of whom lived to adulthood.

In 1894, Broomall died in Philadelphia, Pennsylvania and was interred in the Media Cemetery in Upper Providence Township, Pennsylvania.

== Legacy ==
The community of Broomall, Pennsylvania is named for John Martin Broomall. In 1868, toward the end of his time in Congress, Broomall established a new post office at the crossroads of West Chester Pike and Sproul Road. The post office was named in his honor and the community kept the name as it grew.

In 1967, the Media Swimming and Rowing Club was renamed Broomall's Lake Country Club in honor of Broomall.

U.S. House of Representatives
Preceded by John D. Stiles	Member of the U.S. House of Representatives from Pennsylvania's 7th congressional district 1863–1869	Succeeded by Washington Townsend
