= 20th-century history of women's healthcare in the United States =

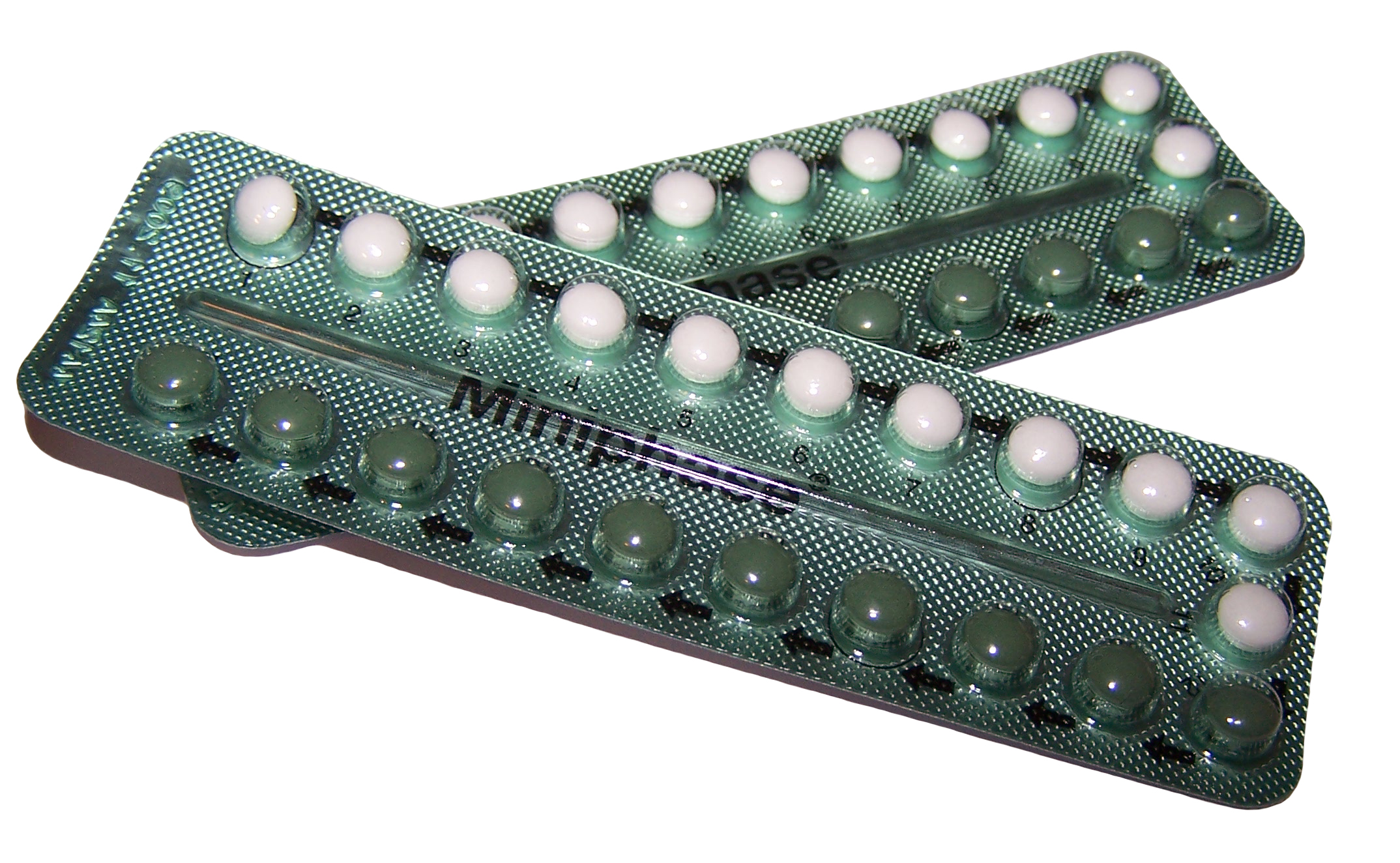
The Food and Drug Administration approved Enovid for contraceptive use in 1960.

During the 20th century, medical practice, reproductive law, public health programs, and insurance coverage changed how women received healthcare in the United States. At the beginning of the century, federal and state laws restricted contraception, while women reformers campaigned for maternity benefits in compulsory health insurance. Race and class affected access to care and treatment by public health agencies. State eugenics programs subjected people classified as unfit to compulsory sterilization; racial and class hierarchies and prejudice against disabled people influenced who received that classification.

From the 1960s, the women's health movement challenged paternalistic care, gender-biased diagnosis, limited medical information, and restrictions on contraception, abortion, and choice in childbirth. Activists formed self-help groups and feminist health centers and pressed hospitals to change maternity care. More women also entered medicine and attained positions in government and healthcare organizations. Griswold v. Connecticut expanded contraceptive rights in 1965, and Roe v. Wade established a constitutional right to abortion in 1973. Women of color also pushed the movement to address sterilization abuse, poverty, welfare rights, and unequal access to care. By the end of the century, more women obtained insurance through their own employment and Medicaid eligibility had expanded, although many remained dependent on a spouse's plan or lacked coverage.

== Effects of the feminist movement on women's healthcare ==
The contemporary women's health movement emerged alongside second-wave feminism in the 1960s and 1970s. Although activists differed in their priorities, common demands included greater control over reproductive decisions and an end to sexist treatment in healthcare. By 1973, more than 1,200 women's self-help health groups existed across the country; they opposed paternalistic medical practices and encouraged women to take a more active role in decisions about their health. Feminist writers challenged the tendency to dismiss women's physical complaints as non-serious or psychosomatic, although evidence of systematic diagnostic bias was limited and sometimes conflicting.

Activists also challenged inadequate informed-consent procedures and limited information about the risks of drugs and medical devices. Feminist health centers and freestanding birth centers opened, hospitals changed their childbirth practices, and the Food and Drug Administration required information inserts for oral contraceptives. Alongside civil-rights legislation barring sex discrimination in federally funded education, it also encouraged more women to enter medicine: the number of women physicians more than doubled between 1970 and 1980, and women accounted for 30% of obstetrician-gynecologists by 1995. During the 1980s and 1990s, activists increasingly worked through federal agencies and professional institutions. Their agenda included biomedical research and women's health across the life course as well as reproductive care.

== Reproductive healthcare ==
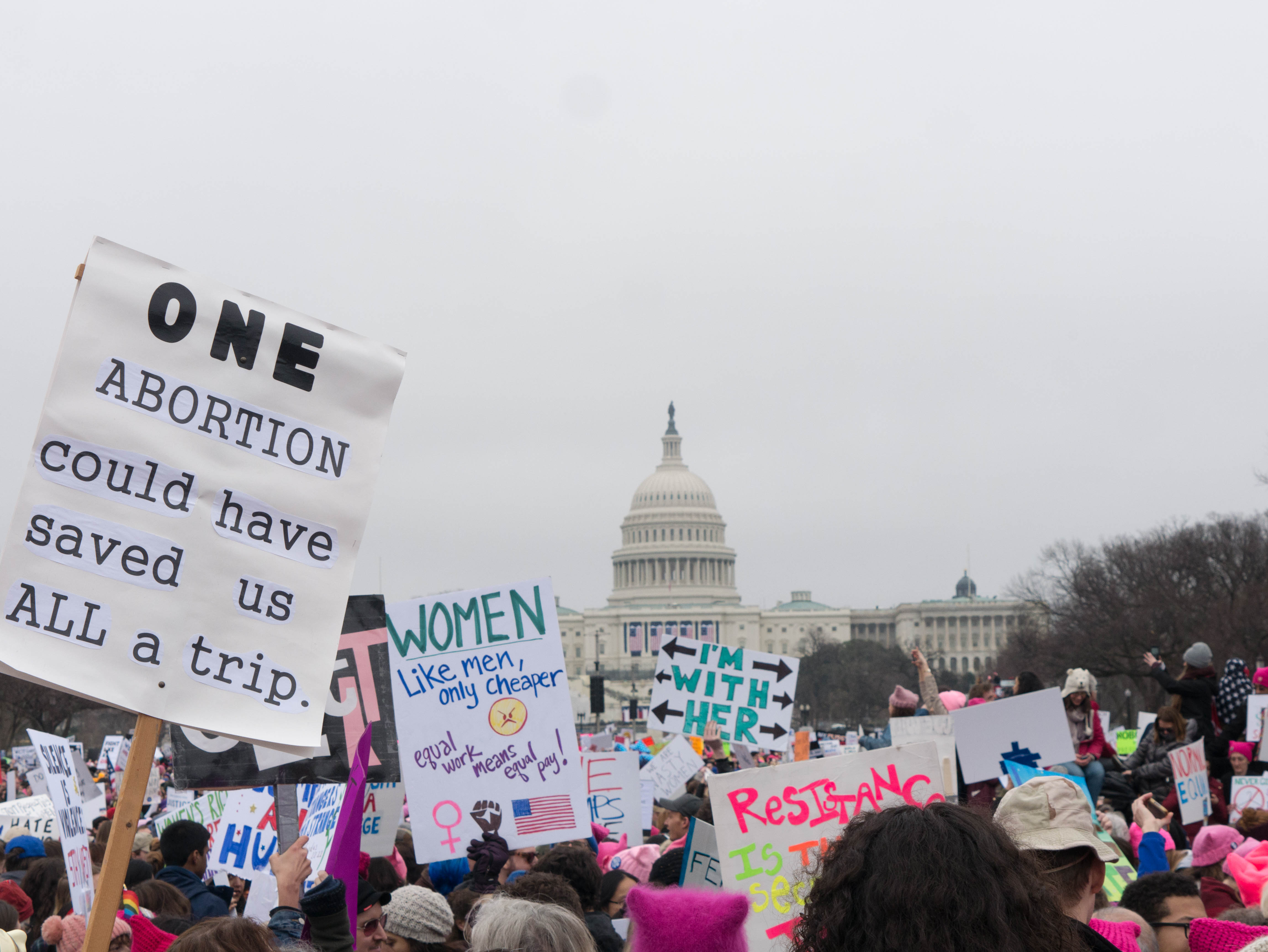
The Supreme Court legalized abortion in 1973 in the Roe v. Wade case.

At the beginning of the twentieth century, federal and state Comstock laws restricted the circulation of contraceptives and information about them. Margaret Sanger challenged these restrictions and opened the first birth control clinic in the United States in 1916. By the 1960s and 1970s, activists campaigned for access to contraception and abortion and for greater choice in childbirth. They supported childbirth education, less routine medical intervention, and the participation of husbands during labor; hospitals later introduced prepared-childbirth classes and more family-centered maternity care.

=== Birth control ===
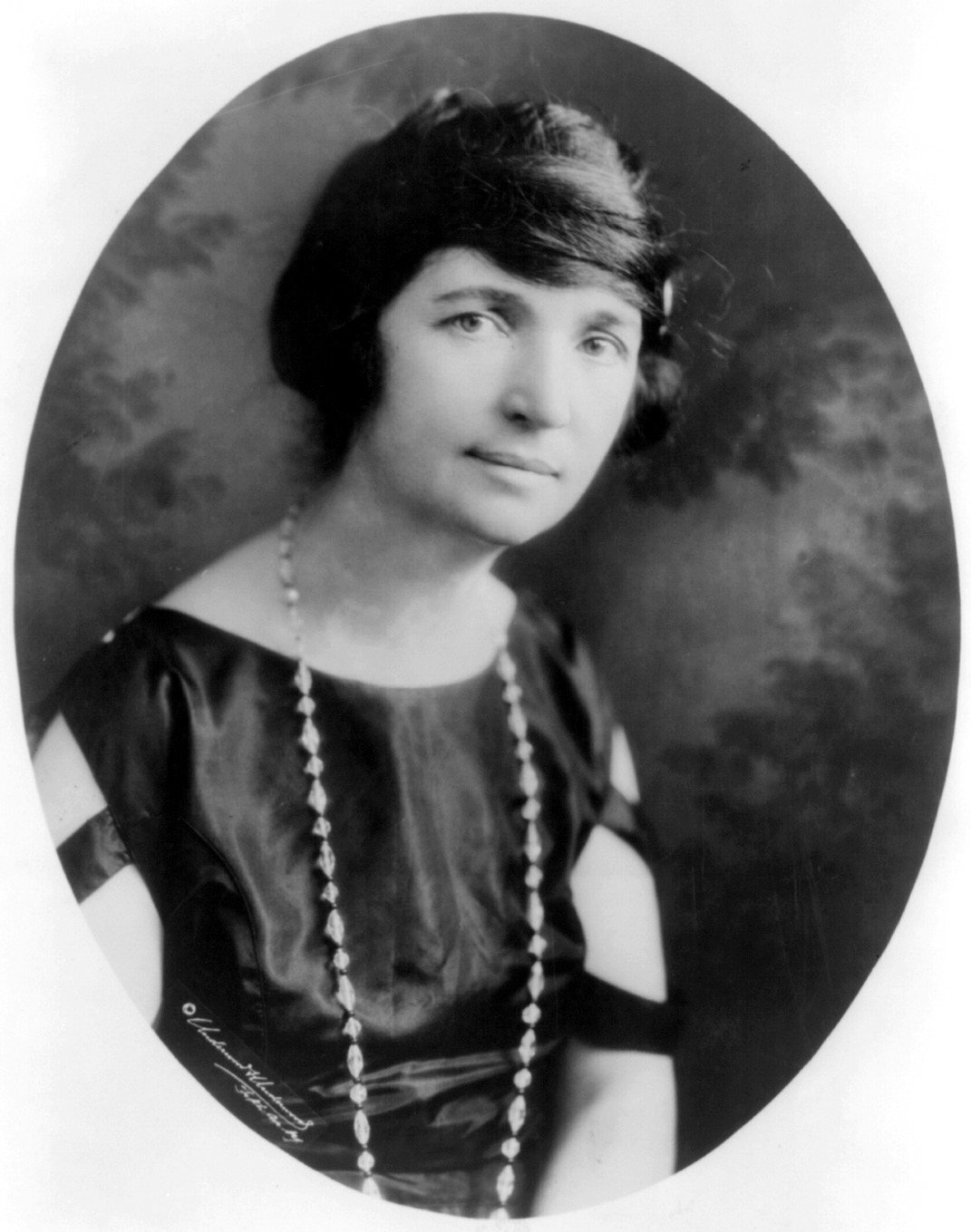
Margaret Sanger popularized the term 'birth control' and opened the first birth control clinic in the United States.

Sanger later promoted research into oral contraception. During the 1950s, Katharine McCormick supplied much of the private funding for the development and early trials of the pill, and the Food and Drug Administration approved Enovid for contraceptive use in 1960. In 1965, Griswold v. Connecticut struck down a state prohibition on contraceptive use by married couples. The pill was effective and could be used independently of intercourse. In Puerto Rico, however, trials used high hormone doses, and participants received little information about the drug's safety or possible adverse effects.

=== Abortion ===
For most of the 1960s, state laws generally permitted abortion only when it was considered necessary to save a pregnant woman's life. Abortion-rights activism became a central part of the women's health movement, and in 1973 Roe v. Wade legalized abortion nationwide. After abortion was legalized, the number of nonhospital facilities offering the procedure grew. In 1972, the Centers for Disease Control and Prevention recorded 39 deaths associated with illegal abortion.

== Healthcare for women of color ==
Race and class affected both access to care and the treatment women received from public health agencies. In 1916, a maternal and infant health project in Columbus Hill, a largely African American and British West Indian neighborhood in New York City, required Black pregnant women seeking assistance to undergo testing and possible treatment for syphilis, although tuberculosis, respiratory illness, and infant diarrheal disease were also widespread. The same organizations later emphasized tuberculosis, pneumonia, and enteritis in an Italian neighborhood. During the 1960s, civil-rights and anti-poverty activists helped establish neighborhood health centers that combined medical care with social services. Women of color later pressed the women's health movement to address sterilization abuse, welfare rights, poverty, and unequal access to care. This activism became part of the reproductive justice movement.

Eugenic sterilization laws were used by 32 states to prevent people classified as unfit from reproducing. Although California's law did not designate racial or ethnic groups, racial and class hierarchies and prejudice against disabled people shaped who was classified as fit or unfit under the program. The state carried out about 20,000 compulsory sterilizations—roughly one-third of the documented national total under state eugenics laws. Among patients in California institutions from 1920 to 1945, Latina women were 59% more likely than non-Latina women to be recommended for sterilization. Sterilization abuse continued after state eugenics programs declined; federally funded procedures performed at a Los Angeles County hospital in the early 1970s became the subject of a lawsuit brought by women of Mexican origin.

== Women's health insurance ==
Women trade unionists and suffragists supported compulsory health insurance with maternity benefits during the Progressive Era; in New York, they joined a labor rally for such legislation in 1919. By 1980, employment-based plans were the largest source of coverage for women aged 25–64, but many women worked in part-time, temporary, service, or small-business jobs that did not provide benefits. A substantial share of insured women obtained coverage as dependents through a spouse; such coverage could be lost through divorce, widowhood, or the spouse's loss of employment.

In the early 1970s, women labor leaders and feminist activists pressed national insurance campaigns to include primary and preventive care; during the Clinton health-reform campaign, the Older Women's League also sought coverage for reproductive, mental-health, and long-term care. During the 1980s and 1990s, more women secured insurance through their own employment and Medicaid eligibility expanded for pregnant and low-income women, yet rising private-insurance costs left a growing share uninsured.

== See also ==
- Contraceptive mandate
- Feminist movement
- Abortion-rights movement
- Women's Health Initiative
