= Elizabeth C. Keller =

American physician and surgeon (1837–1912)

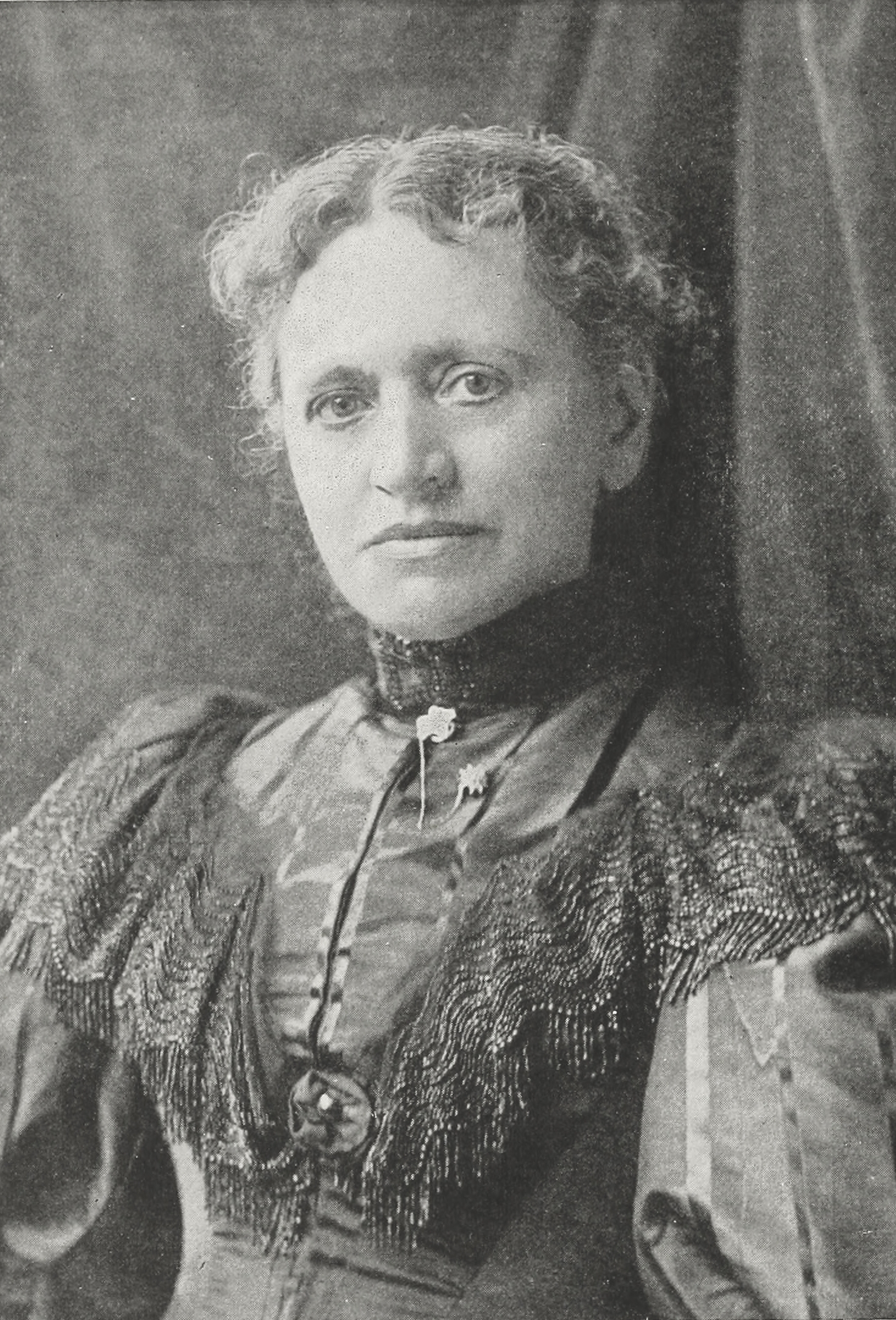
- Born: Elizabeth Catherine Rex; April 4, 1837; Gettysburg, Pennsylvania, U.S.
- Died: November 29, 1912 (aged 75); Jamaica Plain, Massachusetts, U.S.
- Occupation: Physician
- Medical career
- Field: Surgery

Signature
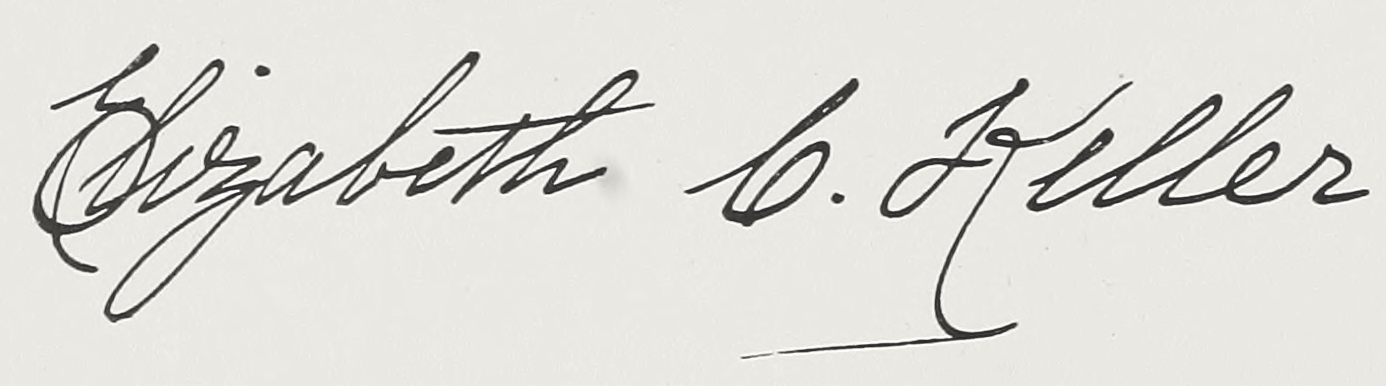

Elizabeth C. Keller (1837–1912) was an American physician and surgeon. She was also a member of the Boston School Committee.

== Early life and education ==
Elizabeth Catherine (or Catharine) Rex born in a small town near Gettysburg, Pennsylvania, April 4, 1837. She was the eighth of a family of twelve children: (Johann (b. 1821), Michael (b. 1823), Maria (b. 1825), Wilhelm (b. 1827), John (b. 1830), George (b. 1833), Thadeus (b. 1835), Lavina (b. 1839), Reuben (b. 18410, Ann (b. 1843), and Martin (b. 1845). Her father Captain Wilhelm William Rex (1789–1863), served in the War of 1812. He was a native of Adams County, Pennsylvania. The mother, Mary Magdalena (Minnich) (1800–1875), was born in the same county. The grandparents on both sides were German.

Her father was a farmer, and that required the children to work on the farm, too. Elizabeth learned all the jobs of farm work, from the building of stone walls, the clearing of fields, the shearing of sheep and the picking of geese to the spinning of flax and wool, and especially to the caring for sick and wounded animals.

Both father and mother were strong adherents of the Lutheran Church. Keller was endowed with a deeply religious nature. At an early age, became an active worker in the church, leading class meetings, giving Bible readings and teaching in Sunday school. At one time, she was almost persuaded that a missionary life was her vocation.

Elizabeth, with her brothers and sisters, attended the district school. She had a private tutor for three years.

== Career ==
She worked as a teacher for seven years.

In 1857, she married Matthias McComsey (1818–1859), of Lancaster, Pennsylvania and within two years, was a mother and a widow. Their child was William Rex McComsey.

In 1860, she was appointed superintendent of the Lancaster Orphans' Home, which later became the Soldiers' Orphans' Home. For seven years, she had charge of the hundreds of children who were provided for in that institution. She was not only the teacher, but also their physician, treating the various diseases incident to childhood.

In 1867, she married George L. Keller (b. 1833), and went to Philadelphia, Pennsylvania, to live.

Being around medical women there in connection with the Woman's Hospital, her natural tendency for medical work evolved, and with the approval of her husband, she entered the Woman's Medical College of Pennsylvania in the fall of 1868, graduating in March, 1871.

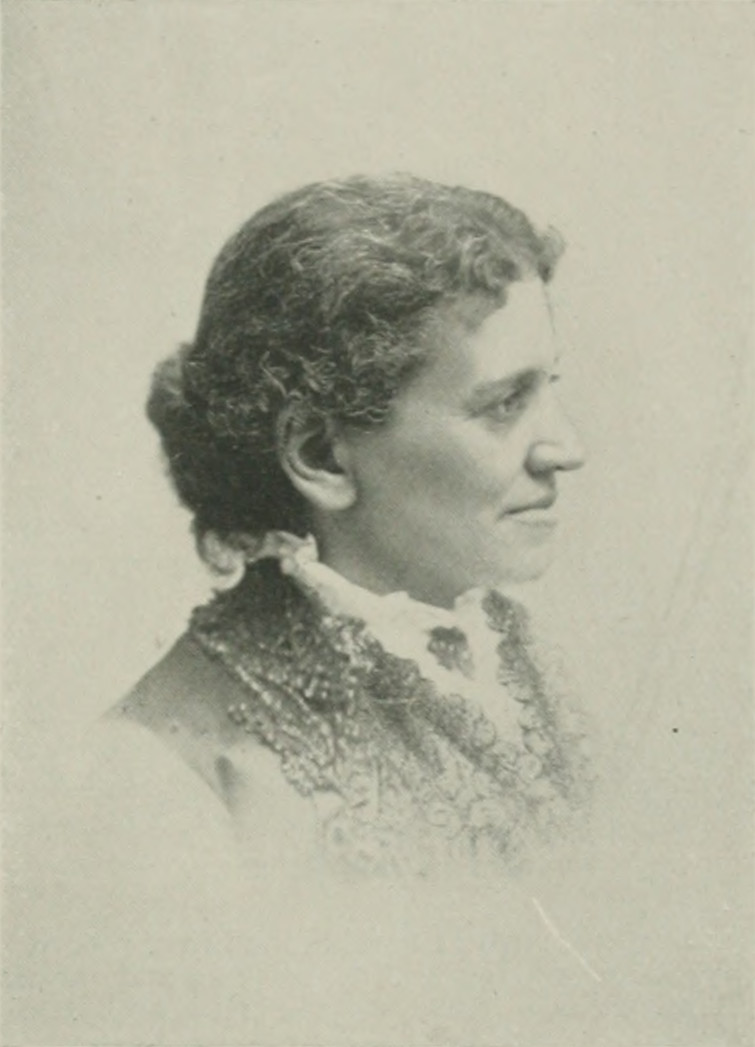
Portrait from A Woman of the Century

After graduation, she almost immediately opened a dispensary and hospital in Bedford Street, Philadelphia.

In 1872, she was appointed successor to Dr. Ann Preston on the board of attending physicians of the Woman's Hospital of Philadelphia, a position which she held until 1875, when she was appointed resident physician of the New England Hospital for Women and Children in Boston. In 1877, she entered upon private practice in Jamaica Plain, one of the suburbs of Boston. From the time of her residency in the New England Hospital, she held the position of senior attending surgeon to that institution. The surgical work there embraced major as well as minor operations, amputations, abdominal sections, and fractures.

Since 1890, Keller was a member of the Boston School Committee. She was a member of the Committees on Text Books, Hygiene, and Examinations. She served as chair of a division which included seven large grammar schools.

== Personal life ==
Keller spent summer months at her mountain retreat in Jaffrey, New Hampshire.

She planned and superintended the building of seven houses and remodeled another during the period of 1878–93.

She has provided home and education for an adopted daughter and three orphaned nieces.

Elizabeth C. Keller died in Jamaica Plains, Massachusetts, November 29, 1912.
