= 1972 in science =

The year 1972 in science and technology involved some significant events, listed below.

== Astronomy and space exploration ==
- January 5 – President of the United States Richard Nixon orders the development of a Space Shuttle program.
- February 4 – Mariner 9 sends pictures from Mars.
- February 21 – The Soviet uncrewed spacecraft Luna 20 lands on the Moon.
- March 2 – Launch of Pioneer 10 spacecraft.
- April 16 – Apollo 16 launched.
- June 30 – The International Time Bureau adds the first leap second to Coordinated Universal Time (UTC).
- July 23 – The United States launches Landsat 1, the first Earth-resources satellite.
- December 7 – Apollo 17 launched with three astronauts and five mice, and The Blue Marble photograph of the Earth is taken.
- December 11 – NASA astronauts Eugene Cernan and Harrison Schmitt land on the Moon and begin a three-day exploration.

== Biology ==
- February – S. J. Singer and Garth L. Nicolson describe the fluid mosaic model of the functional cell membrane.
- September – Geoffrey Burnstock proposes the existence of a non-adrenergic, non-cholinergic (NANC) neurotransmitter, which he identifies as adenosine triphosphate (ATP), originating the term 'purinergic signalling'.
- October 1 – The first publication reporting the production of a recombinant DNA molecule, by Paul Berg and colleagues, marks the birth of modern molecular biology methodology.
- Niles Eldredge and Stephen Jay Gould publish their landmark paper on punctuated equilibrium.
- Socorro doves (Zenaida graysoni) last seen in the wild. The species precariously survives in captivity. A reintroduction program is being prepared.

== Computer science ==
- April 6 – Cray Research founded.
- May – Magnavox release the first home video game console which can be connected to a television set – the Magnavox Odyssey, invented by Ralph H. Baer.
- July 12 – First C compiler released.
- October – The First International Conference on Computer Communications is held in Washington, D.C., and hosts the first public demonstration of ARPAnet, a precursor of the Internet.
- November 29 – Atari release the production version of Pong, one of the first video games, devised by Nolan Bushnell and Allan Alcorn.
- Karen Spärck Jones introduces the concept of inverse document frequency (idf) weighting in information retrieval.
- Write-only memory is devised as a joke in Signetics.

== Earth sciences ==
- February 8 – First Global Boundary Stratotype Section and Point (GSSP) defined at the Silurian-Devonian boundary at Klonk in the Czech Republic.

== Ecology ==
- January – A Blueprint for Survival first published as a special edition of The Ecologist magazine in the United Kingdom.
- James Lovelock first refers to the Gaia hypothesis in print.
- The Climatic Research Unit is founded by climatologist Hubert Lamb at the University of East Anglia in the UK.

== Mathematics ==
- Daniel Quillen formulates higher algebraic K-theory.
- Daniel Gorenstein announces a 16-step program for completing the classification of finite simple groups.
- Richard M. Karp shows that the Hamiltonian cycle problem is NP-complete.

== Medicine ==
- January 31 – Immunosuppressive effect of ciclosporin discovered by a team at Sandoz, Basel, under Hartmann F. Stähelin.
- Harvey J. Alter identifies the presence of hepatitis C virus.
- Tu Youyou and collaborators obtain a pure extract of the antiplasmodial drug artemisinin.
- Archie Cochrane publishes Effectiveness and Efficiency: Random Reflections on Health Services in the U.K.
- John Yudkin publishes Pure, White and Deadly in the U.K., warning of the dangers of sucrose in diet.
- The last major epidemic of smallpox in Europe breaks out in Yugoslavia.

== Metrology ==
- 00:00:00 UTC matches 00:00:10 TAI exactly and the tick rate of UTC is changed to match TAI exactly.

== Paleontology ==
- Kielan-Jawarowska and Rinchen Barsbold report the associated remains of a Velociraptor and Protoceratops apparently killed and preserved while fighting.

== Psychology ==
- Daniel Kahneman and Amos Tversky begin to publish together on cognitive bias and heuristics in judgment and decision-making.

== Technology ==
- February 1 – The first scientific hand-held calculator (labeled Hewlett-Packard, later designated the HP-35) is introduced, at a price of $395.00.
- July 10 – Jack Cover files U.S. patent 3,803,463 for the original form of Taser electroshock weapon.
- English inventor Peter Powell develops a steerable dual-line kite.

== Awards ==
- Nobel Prizes
  - Physics – John Bardeen, Leon Neil Cooper, John Robert Schrieffer
  - Chemistry – Christian B. Anfinsen, Stanford Moore, William H. Stein
  - Medicine – Gerald Edelman, Rodney R Porter
- Turing Award – Edsger Dijkstra

== Births ==
- March 31 – Evan Williams, American Internet entrepreneur.
- April 5 – Nima Arkani-Hamed, Canadian-American theoretical physicist.
- June 21 – Warren Lyford DeLano, American bioinformatician and open source advocate (d. 2009).
- unknown date – Kathy Vivas, Venezuelan astrophysicist

== Deaths ==
- February 20 – Maria Goeppert Mayer (b. 1906), German-American theoretical physicist, recipient of the Nobel Prize in Physics.
- May 4 – Edward Calvin Kendall (b. 1886), American chemist, recipient of the Nobel Prize in Physiology or Medicine.
- May 8 – Beatrice Helen Worsley (b. 1921), Canadian computer scientist.
- August 11 – Max Theiler (b. 1899), South African-born American virologist, recipient of the Nobel Prize in Physiology or Medicine.
- August 22 – Ștefan Procopiu (b. 18990), Romanian physicist.
- August 25 – Lucien Bull (b. 1876), Irish-born French pioneer in chronophotography.
- October 1 – Louis Leakey (b. 1903), British paleoanthropologist.
- November 25 – Henri Coandă (b. 1886), Romanian aeronautical engineer.
