= 1876 in science =

The year 1876 in science and technology involved some significant events, listed below.

== Astronomy ==
- December 7 – First recorded observation of the Great White Spot on Saturn, made by American astronomer Asaph Hall, who uses it to calculate the planet's rotation period.

== Biology ==
- Robert Koch demonstrates that Bacillus anthracis is the source of anthrax, the first bacterium conclusively shown to cause disease.
- Koller's sickle in avian gastrulation is first described by August Rauber.
- Francis Galton invents the silent dog whistle.
- Meiosis is discovered and described for the first time in sea urchin eggs by the German biologist Oscar Hertwig.
- The Conchological Society of Great Britain & Ireland is founded.

== Chemistry ==
- Josiah Willard Gibbs publishes On the Equilibrium of Heterogeneous Substances, a compilation of his work on thermodynamics and physical chemistry which lays out the concept of free energy to explain the physical basis of chemical equilibria.

== Exploration ==
- May 24 – End of the Challenger expedition.

== Mathematics ==
- Édouard Lucas demonstrates that 127 is a Mersenne prime, the largest that will be recorded for seventy-five years. He also shows that the Mersenne number 2^{67} − 1, or M_{67}, must have factors.

== Medicine ==
- February 22 – Swedish woman Karolina Olsson lapses into a form of hibernation for 32 years.
- May 10 – Major pharmaceutical brand Eli Lilly is founded in Indiana, United States.
- June 6 – The Association of Medical Officers of American Institutions for Idiotic and Feebleminded Persons, later known as the American Association on Intellectual and Developmental Disabilities, is founded when several directors led by Édouard Séguin, inspired by Centennial events, meet to improve the lives of those with disabilities.
- David Ferrier publishes The Functions of the Brain.
- William Macewen demonstrates clinical diagnosis of the site of brain tumors and performs the first successful intercranial surgery.
- Patrick Manson begins studying filariasis infection in humans.
- Meharry Medical College founded in Nashville, Tennessee as the Medical Department of Central Tennessee College; it is the first medical school for African Americans in the Southern United States.

== Technology ==
- February 14 – Scottish American inventor Alexander Graham Bell and American electrical engineer Elisha Gray each file a patent for the telephone, initiating the Elisha Gray and Alexander Bell telephone controversy.
- March 7 – Alexander Graham Bell is granted a patent for the telephone.
- March 10 – Alexander Graham Bell makes the first successful bi-directional telephone call, saying "Mr. Watson, come here, I want to see you".
- April – Joseph Zentmayer makes his Centennial microscope in the United States.
- April 15 – Russian-born electrical engineer Pavel Yablochkov first publicly demonstrates the 'Yablochkov candle', a form of arc lamp, in London.
- May 17 – Nicolaus Otto files his patent for the four-stroke engine using the Otto cycle.
- August 8 – Thomas Edison is granted a United States patent for his mimeograph.
- Emile Berliner invents an improved form of microphone (the carbon-button type) which will be adopted for Alexander Graham Bell's telephone.
- Francis Edgar Stanley of Newton, Massachusetts, patents an atomizing paint distributor, a form of airbrush.
- The Seth Thomas Clock Company is awarded a United States patent for an adjustable wind-up alarm clock.
- Thomas Hawksley first uses pressure grouting to control water leakage under an embankment dam at Tunstall Reservoir in Weardale, County Durham, England.
- Melville Reuben Bissell files a United States patent for an improved carpet sweeper.

== Institutions ==
- October 4 – First classes begin at the Agricultural and Mechanical College of Texas.
- Elizabeth Bragg becomes the first woman to graduate with a civil engineering degree in the United States, from University of California, Berkeley.

== Awards ==
- Copley Medal: Claude Bernard
- Wollaston Medal: Thomas Henry Huxley

== Births ==
- January 5 – Lucien Bull (died 1972), Irish-born pioneer in chronophotography.
- January 23 – Otto Diels (died 1954), German Nobel Prize winner in chemistry.
- February 15 – E. H. "Chinese" Wilson (died 1930), English-born plant collector.
- April 22 – Robert Bárány (died 1936), Viennese-born Nobel Prize winner in medicine.
- June 13 – William Sealy Gosset (died 1937), English statistician.
- October 3 – Gabrielle Howard née Matthaei (died 1930), English-born plant physiologist.
- November 9 – Hideyo Noguchi (died 1928), Japanese bacteriologist.
- November 19 – Tatyana Afanasyeva (died 1964), Russian-born mathematician.
- November 25 – Paul Nitsche (executed 1948) Nazi German psychiatrist and eugenicist.

== Deaths ==
- November 26 – Karl Ernst von Baer (born 1792), Baltic German naturalist.
- Undated – Anna Volkova (born 1800), Russian chemist.
