= List of Pennsylvania state historical markers in Delaware County =

Location of Delaware County in Pennsylvania

This is a list of the Pennsylvania state historical markers in Delaware County.

This is intended to be a complete list of the official state historical markers placed in Delaware County, Pennsylvania by the Pennsylvania Historical and Museum Commission (PHMC). The locations of the historical markers, as well as the latitude and longitude coordinates as provided by the PHMC's database, are included below when available. There are 71 historical markers located in Delaware County.

== Historical markers ==
Marker title	Image	Date dedicated	Location	Municipality	Marker type	Topics	Marker Image
Abraham L. Pennock		October 24, 1985	At library on Maple Avenue between Wayne and Hazel, off S. State Rd. (SR 2026), 39.9623°N 75.2736°W	Upper Darby	Roadside	African American, Government & Politics, Government & Politics 19th Century, Underground Railroad, Women	
American Viscose Co.	framless	October 5, 2002	Viscose Village Plaza, 39.8217°N 75.4122°W	Marcus Hook	Roadside	Buildings, Business & Industry, Entrepreneurs, Labor, Military, Military Post-Civil War, Women	
Anna Howard Shaw (1847-1919)		May 17, 2014	S Orange St. & S Ridley Creek Rd., 39.90596°N 75.39656°W	Media	Roadside	Government & Politics 19th Century, Government & Politics 20th Century, Professions & Vocations, Religion, Science & Medicine, Women	
Battle of Brandywine		May 12, 1952	US 1, at entrance to Brandywine Battlefield Park; 39.87378°N 75.578041°W	Brandywine Battlefield State Park	Roadside	American Revolution, George Washington, Military	
Battle of Brandywine		May 12, 1952	US 202/322 just S of Brinton's Bridge/Dilworthtown Rd., 1.6 miles N of US 1, 39.90075°N 75.56337°W	Chadds Ford	Roadside	American Revolution, George Washington, Military	
Battle of Brandywine		May 12, 1952	U.S. 1, at entrance to Brandywine Battlefield Park; 39.8227°N 75.5884°W	Brandywine Battlefield State Park	Roadside	American Revolution, Military	
Benjamin West		March 3, 1948	Pa. 320 in Swarthmore (Missing); 39.901086°N 75.350911°W	Swarthmore	Roadside	Artists	
Caleb Pusey		June 9, 1967	Race St. at City Rd., 39.8516°N 75.55145°W	Upland	City	Professions & Vocations, Religion, William Penn	
Caroline Burnham Kilgore (1838-1909)		September 26, 2024	1301 Baltimore Pike, 39.913022°N 75.352517°W	Springfield	Roadside	Women, Professions & Vocations	
Casimir Pulaski		September 13, 1975	U.S. 1 E of Chadds Ford near entrance to Brandywine Battlefield State Park; 39.8735°N 75.572°W	Brandywine Battlefield State Park	Roadside	American Revolution, Ethnic & Immigration, George Washington, Military	
Chester		October 13, 1947	U.S. 322 at NW end of city (Missing)	Chester	Roadside	Cities & Towns, Early Settlement, Ethnic & Immigration, Government & Politics, Government & Politics 17th Century, William Penn	
Colonial Courthouse		May 14, 1954	Ave. of the States near 5th St., 39.848°N 75.3599°W	Chester	City	Buildings, Government & Politics, Government & Politics 18th Century	
Colonial Gristmill		May 5, 1959	U.S. 1, 1 mile E of Concordville; 39.8911°N 75.5056°W	Concordville	Roadside	Buildings, Business & Industry, Ethnic & Immigration, Mills, Religion	
Darby Friends Burial Ground		June 1, 1952	Landsdowne Avenue near 12th Street, 39.92286°N 75.26544°W	Darby	Roadside	Religion	
Delaware County		October 3, 1982	Courthouse, Front St. & Veterans Sq., 39.9192°N 75.392°W	Media	City	Government & Politics, Government & Politics 18th Century, William Penn	
Dr. Anna E. Broomall		March 26, 2019	Widener Univ., 13th & Chestnut Sts., 39.85972°N 75.35611°W	Chester	City	Professions & Vocations, Science & Medicine, Women	
Dr. George Smith		October 25, 1985	Off Marvine Ave. at Mansion Dr. on Collenbrook property, 39.9514°N 75.3211°W	Drexel Hill	Roadside	Education, Government & Politics, Government & Politics 19th Century, Medicine & Science, Professions & Vocations	
Dr. Philip Jaisohn		May 21, 1994	100 E. Lincoln St., 39.9139°N 75.3877°W	Media	Roadside	Ethnic & Immigration, Government & Politics, Government & Politics 20th Century, Medicine & Science, Professions & Vocations	
Eddystone Rifle Plant		November 9, 2019	13th Ave. & Simpson St., 39.86436°N 75.34318°W	Eddystone	Roadside	Labor, Military, Military Post-Civil War, Women	
Ethel Waters (1896-1977)		June 28, 2015	PA 291 & Edgmont Ave., (Missing); 39.84956°N 75.35575°W	Chester	City	African American, Motion Pictures & Television, Music & Theater, Performers, Women	
Fanny Jackson Coppin		February 12, 1986	Cheyney University campus, off Dilworthtown & Cheyney Rds., 39.9327°N 75.5277°W	Cheyney	City	African American, Education, Professions & Vocations, Religion, Women, Writers	
FBI Office Burglary		September 1, 2021	1-7 Veterans Square, 39.91911°N 75.39175°W	Media	Roadside	Government & Politics, Government & Politics 20th Century	
Finland		May 21, 1955	Concord Ave. at monument in Chester; 39.8496°N 75.378°W	Chester	City	Early Settlement, Ethnic & Immigration	
First Friends Meeting		October 22, 1997	24th & Chestnut Sts., Chester; 39.8695°N 75.3632°W	Chester	City	Religion, William Penn	
George H. Earle III (1890-1974)		September 28, 2018	3 Earle's Ln., 40.0094°N 75.38874°W	Newtown Sq.	Roadside	Civil Rights, Government & Politics 20th Century, Governors, Labor, Military, Roads	
Glen Mills		September 23, 1997	Railroad Station, 39.9204°N 75.4904°W	Glen Mills	Roadside	Business & Industry, Government & Politics, Government & Politics 18th Century, Iron, Mills, Railroads	
Governor Printz Park		June 28, 1948	At site, 2nd St. & Taylor Ave., 39.8623°N 75.3026°W	Essington	Roadside	Early Settlement, Ethnic & Immigration, Government & Politics 17th Century	
Great Trail (The) - Minquas or Susquehanna Indians (PLAQUE)		June 5, 1926	Rose Valley Rd. (SR 3019), west side, 1/2 mile S of Moylan (Missing); 39.8985°N 75.3876°W		Plaque	Early Settlement, Ethnic & Immigration, Native American, Paths & Trails	
Green-Bank		May 15, 1954	2nd St. near Welsh St., Chester; 39.84652°N 75.3563°W	Chester	City	Buildings, Houses & Homesteads, Military	
Haverford Meeting House		September 24, 1946	U.S. 30 bypass near Haverford (Missing)	Haverford	City	Houses & Homesteads, Religion	
Hilldale Athletic Club, The (The Darby Daisies)		October 14, 2006	Cedar Ave. & MacDade Blvd. 39.9249°N 75.2565°W	Yeadon	Roadside	African American, Baseball, Sports	
Ivy Mills		September 4, 2001	109 Ivy Mill Road at Polecat Road, 39.8856°N 75.4849°W	Glen Mills	Roadside	Business & Industry, Government & Politics 18th Century, Mills, Religion	
J. Edgar Thomson		June 25, 1991	Junction SR 2016 (Baltimore Pike) & SR 2027 (Thomson Ave.) just NE of Swarthmore (Missing); 39.91577°N 75.33737°W	Swarthmore	City	Professions & Vocations, Railroads, Transportation	
John Chad's House - PLAQUE		September 1, 1915	Lawn of Chadd homestead on PA 100 just N of US 1, 39.8748°N 75.5917°W	Chadds Ford	Plaque	American Revolution, Houses & Homesteads, Military	
John Morton		January 27, 1967	420 E. Ridley Ave., Ridley Park, Chester; 39.8842°N 75.3185°W	Chester	Roadside	Government & Politics, Government & Politics 18th Century	
Joshua Humphrey		October 13, 1947	SR 1001 (Haverford Ave.) near Haverford; 39.9969°N 75.3033°W	Haverford	Roadside	Military, Professions & Vocations	
Joshua Pusey		March 27, 1993	#11 N. Middletown Rd. (Pa. 352), 39.9236°N 75.4434°W	Lima	Roadside	Business & Industry, Civil War, Invention, Professions & Vocations, Religion	
Lazaretto Quarantine Station		October 25, 2008	99 Wanamaker Ave., at 2nd St. intersection, 39.8622°N 75.2996°W	Essington	Roadside	Ethnic & Immigration, Government & Politics 19th Century, Medicine & Science	
Leiper Railway		February 7, 1955	SR 2008 (Bullens Ln.) E of Pa. 320, 39.8763°N 75.3576°W	Nether Providence Twp.	Roadside	Railroads, Transportation	
Lower Swedish Cabin		October 21, 1989	At site on Creek Rd., 39.93818°N 75.30152°W	Clifton Heights	City	Early Settlement, Ethnic & Immigration	
Marcus Hook		October 13, 1947	U.S. 13 at Municipal Bldg., 39.819°N 75.4188°W	Marcus Hook	Roadside	Business & Industry, Early Settlement, Ethnic & Immigration	
Martin Luther King Jr.		January 14, 1984	Calvary Baptist Church, 1616 W. 2nd St. (Pa. 291), Chester; 39.837250°N 75.377944°W	Chester	City	African American, Civil Rights, Religion	
Martin Luther King Jr.		July 27, 1992	Crozer-Chester Medical Center, One Medical Center Blvd., Upland; 39.8559°N 75.3709°W	Upland	City	African American, Civil Rights, Religion	MISSING as of 10/10/2026
Mildred Scott Olmsted (1890-1990)		September 13, 2015	41 Rose Valley Rd., 39.89913°N 75.38773°W	Rose Valley	Roadside	Civil Rights, Government & Politics 20th Century, Religion, Women	
Minquas' Path		October 13, 1947	SR 3019 (Rose Valley Rd.) west side, 1/2 mile S of Moylan; 39.8985°N 75.3876°W		Roadside	Native American, Paths & Trails, Transportation	
Morton Homestead		September 9, 1966	At site, Pa. 420 at Darby Creek, 39.8774°N 75.3053°W	Prospect Park	Roadside	Early Settlement, Government & Politics, Government & Politics 17th Century	
Morton Morton House		November 10, 2019	517 Winona Ave., 39.88213°N 75.29041°W	Norwood	City	Buildings & Architecture, Early Settlement, Ethnic & Immigration, Government & Politics 18th Century, Houses & Homesteads	
New Sweden		April 9, 1988	Governor Printz Park, 2nd St. & Taylor Ave., 39.861°N 75.3027°W	Essington	Roadside	Early Settlement, Ethnic & Immigration, Exploration	
Nile Swim Club		May 22, 2021	At entrance to club on 513 S Union Ave., 39.934095°N 75.263814°W	Yeadon	Roadside	African American, Civil Rights, Sports & Recreation	
Old Haverford Friends' Meeting		October 24, 1975	SR 1005 (E. Eagle Rd.) at St. Denis Ave., 39.991°N 75.3048°W	Havertown	Roadside	Religion, William Penn	
Old Swedish Burial Ground		May 15, 1954	3rd St., E of Ave. of the States; 39.8472°N 75.3584°W		City	Ethnic & Immigration, Religion	
Penn Landing		October 13, 1947	SE corner, 2nd (Pa. 291) & Penn Sts., Chester; 39.84413°N 75.36143°W	Chester	Roadside	Early Settlement, Exploration, Government & Politics, Government & Politics 17th Century, William Penn	
Pennsylvania		May 12, 1949	U.S. 202 at state line 39.8392°N 75.5393°W		Roadside	Government & Politics, Government & Politics 17th Century, William Penn	
Pennsylvania		May 12, 1949	U.S. 13 by-pass, approx. 100 feet from state line 39.81234°N 75.43114°W		Roadside	Government & Politics, Government & Politics 17th Century, William Penn	
Radnor Meeting House		October 13, 1947	Junction Pa. 320 & SR SR 1019 (Conestoga Rd.), Ithan, S of St. Davids; 40.0303°N 75.364°W	St Davids	Roadside	American Revolution, Early Settlement, Houses & Homesteads, Military, Religion	
Rochambeau Route (Narragansett Bay to Yorktown)		October 18, 1954	U.S. 13 (Morton Ave.) near Melrose Ave., E end of Chester; 39.8585°N 75.3525°W	Chester	Roadside	American Revolution, Military, Roads, Transportation	
Sellers Hall		October 25, 1985	N. side Walnut St. between Copley and Glendale Rds., 39.9569°N 75.2615°W	Upper Darby	Roadside	Early Settlement, Buildings, Medicine & Science, Professions & Vocations	
Springfield Friends Meeting		October 25, 1951	SR 2009 (Old Sproul & W. Springfield Rds.), 39.9423°N 75.3471°W	Springfield	Roadside	Artists, Buildings, Education, Religion	
St. David's Church		October 13, 1947	SR 1046 (St. David's Rd.) at SR 1017 (Church Rd.) 2 miles SW of 40.0226°N 75.3994°W	Wayne	Roadside	American Revolution, Ethnic & Immigration, Military, Religion	
Sun Shipbuilding and Dry Dock Company		October 6, 2007	intersection of Industrial Hwy. (Rt. 291) & Harrah's Blvd., Chester; 39.85329°N 75.3487°W	Chester	Roadside	Business & Industry, Labor, Military, Military Post-Civil War, Oil & Gas, Steel	
Tatiana Proskouriakoff (1909-1985)		August 1, 2015	S Lansdowne Ave. & Fairview Ave., 39.93326°N 75.27001°W	Lansdowne	Roadside	Education, Exploration, Professions & Vocations, Science & Medicine, Women, Writers	
The Slinky Toy		August 30, 2019	2 W Baltimore Pike (at Springfield Rd.), 39.9289°N 75.2969°W	Clifton Heights	Roadside	Invention, Sports & Recreation, Women	
The Williamson Free School of Mechanical Trades		June 1, 2013	106 S New Middletown Rd, 39.90973°N 75.41991°W	Media	Roadside	Buildings & Architecture, Education, Professions & Vocations	
Thomas Garrett (1789-1871)		October 25, 1981	Garrett Rd. & Maple Ave., 39.9461°N 75.2935°W	Drexel Hill	Roadside	African American, Religion, Underground Railroad	
Thomas Massey House		May 9, 1986	467 Lawrence Rd. (SR 1020), .5 mile NE of Pa. 320, 39.9658°N 75.3518°W	Broomall	Roadside	Early Settlement, Buildings, Homesteads	
Tinicum		October 13, 1947	Pa. 291 eastbound, just NE of Essington; 39.8671°N 75.2937°W	Essington	Roadside	Early Settlement, Ethnic & Immigration, Government & Politics 17th Century	
Washington House		May 15, 1954	Ave. of the States near 5th St., Chester; 39.8481°N 75.3596°W	Chester	City	American Revolution, Buildings, George Washington, Houses & Homesteads	
Wayne Natatorium		October 17, 2010	Willow Ave & Radnor Street Rd., 40.04822°N 75.38075°W	Wayne	Roadside	Sports & Recreation, Women	
William Lightfoot Price (1861-1916)		November 6, 2021	At Thunderbird Lodge, 44 Rose Valley Rd., 39.898625°N 75.387466°W	Rose Valley	Roadside	Buildings & Architecture	
William Penn (1644-1718) - "Essex House" - PLAQUE		October 1, 1932	102 Penn St., Chester (Missing); 39.86099°N 75.3027°W	Chester	Plaque	Early Settlement, Houses & Homesteads, William Penn	Missing as of 10/4/2026
William Penn - First Assembly - PLAQUE		October 28, 1932	207 Edgmont Ave, Chester (Missing)	Chester	Plaque	Government & Politics 17th Century, William Penn	Missing as of 10/4/2026

== See also ==
- List of Pennsylvania state historical markers
- National Register of Historic Places listings in Delaware County, Pennsylvania
