= Pennock =

Pennock may refer to:

- Pennock (surname)
- Pennock, Minnesota, United States
- Pennock Island, Alaska
- Carrosseriefabriek Pennock, Dutch coachbuilding company
