= Lustig =

Lustig is a surname. Notable people with the surname include:

- Aaron Lustig (born 1956), American actor
- Alessandro Lustig (1857–1937), Austro-Italian pathologist
- Alvin Lustig (1915–1955), American designer
- Arnošt Lustig (1926–2011), Czech author
- Billy Lustig (died 1913), American gang leader
- Bob Lustig, American football manager
- Branko Lustig (1932–2019), Croatian film producer
- main character in the fairy tale Brother Lustig
- Eugenia Sacerdote de Lustig (1910–2011), Argentine physician
- Friedrich Lustig (1912–1989), Estonian Buddhist monk
- Fritz Lustig (1919–2017), German-Jewish emigrant to England during the Nazi era
- Jo Lustig (1925–1999), American music entrepreneur
- John Lustig (born 1953), American comics writer
- Mikael Lustig (born 1986), Swedish footballer
- Nora Lustig, Argentine economist
- Peter Lustig (1937–2016), German television presenter and children's author
- Robin Lustig (born 1948), British radio broadcaster
- Robert H. Lustig, American pediatrician
- Victor Lustig (1890–1947), Czech-born con artist
- William Lustig (born 1955), American film director and producer

== See also ==
- Lustick
