= John Yudkin =

British physiologist and nutritionist

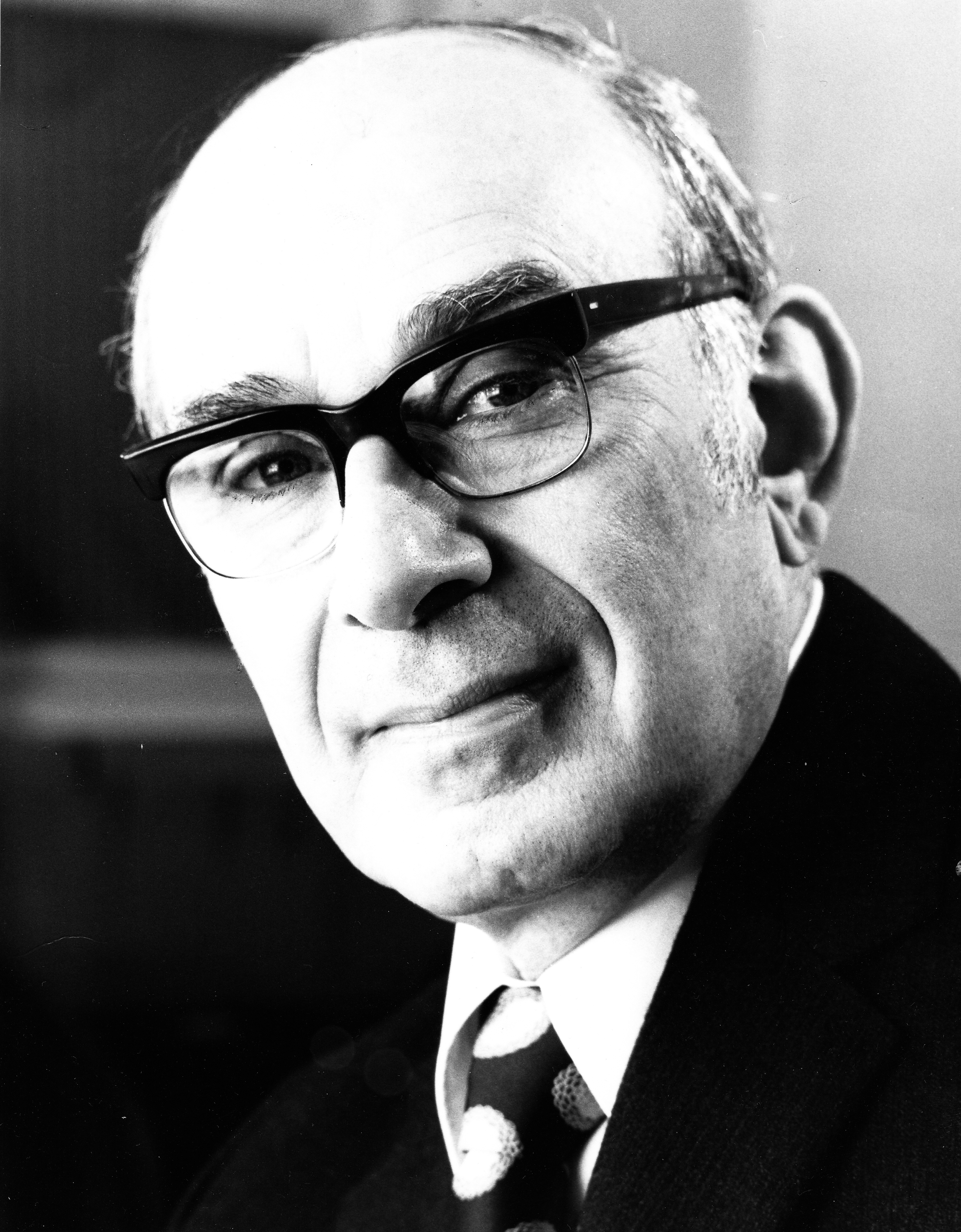
- Born: 8 August 1910; London, England, UK
- Died: 12 July 1995 (aged 84); London, England, UK
- Education: Chelsea Polytechnic (BSc); Christ's College, Cambridge (BA, PhD, MB BChir, MD)
- Occupations: Professor of Physiology (1945–1954) and Professor of Nutrition (1954–1971) at Queen Elizabeth College
- Notable work: Pure, White and Deadly

John Yudkin FRSC (8 August 1910 – 12 July 1995) was a British physiologist and nutritionist, and the founding Professor of the Department of Nutrition at Queen Elizabeth College, London.

Yudkin wrote several books recommending low-carbohydrate diets for weight loss, including This Slimming Business (1958). He gained an international reputation for his book Pure, White and Deadly (1972), which warned that the consumption of sugar (sucrose, which consists of fructose and glucose) is dangerous to health, an argument he had made since at least 1957. Specifically, he wrote that sugar consumption was a factor in the development of conditions such as dental caries, obesity, diabetes, and heart attack.

Yudkin's failure to incorporate possible confounding factors in his case-control designs was an area of heavy criticism at the time; apart from other unmeasured known risk factors that might affect cardiovascular disease (CVD), data had emerged soon after, suggesting that sugar intake was associated with smoking, a big risk factor for CVD. Yudkin's failure to account for confounding factors led to harsh words from Ancel Keys at the time.

From the late 2000s, there was a resurgence of interest in his work, following a 2009 YouTube video about sugar and high-fructose corn syrup by the pediatric endocrinologist Robert Lustig, and because of increasing concern about an obesity epidemic and metabolic syndrome. Pure, White and Deadly was republished in 2012, with a foreword by Lustig.

== Early life and education ==
Yudkin was raised in the East End of London in an Orthodox Jewish family that had fled the Russian pogroms of 1905. His father's death left six-year-old Yudkin and his four brothers to be raised by their mother in considerable poverty. He won scholarships to Hackney Downs School (formerly the Grocers' Company's School), and another from there to Chelsea Polytechnic. After gaining his BSc degree in 1929 he briefly considered a career in teaching, but then discovered that he could sit an examination for a scholarship to the University of Cambridge. He matriculated at Christ's College, Cambridge as a scholar, and graduated in biochemistry at the age of 20 in 1931.

He worked for his PhD in the Department of Biochemistry at Cambridge under the supervision of Marjory Stephenson, a pioneer of research in bacterial metabolism, who funded his work. His PhD thesis was on "adaptive enzymes" (subsequently termed "induced enzyme synthesis"). His account of the phenomenon inspired the research of Jacques Monod, who later worked out a detailed mechanism for the induction of enzymes in bacteria and was awarded the Nobel Prize for his work.

In 1933 Yudkin married Milly Himmelweit, who had recently left Berlin to escape the worsening political situation. The marriage lasted until her death in March 1995. They had three sons, Michael (born 1938), Jonathan (1944–2012) and Jeremy (born 1948).

While pursuing his PhD research, Yudkin took up medical studies in 1934 and started teaching physiology and biochemistry to medical students, first at Christ's College, then also at other colleges in Cambridge. He began clinical studies at The London Hospital in 1935, while continuing to teach in Cambridge one weekday and at weekends.

== Career ==
Fellowships
- FRSC (1938)
- MRCP (1946)
- FIBiol (1958)
- FRCP (1975)
- Fellow of King's College, London (1971)
- Honorary Fellow of the Hebrew University, Jerusalem (1993)

Yudkin completed his medical studies in 1938, and was appointed Director of Medical Studies at Christ's College. The same year, he started research at the Dunn Nutritional Laboratory in Cambridge, working principally on the effects of dietary vitamins.

His studies of the nutritional status of school children in Cambridge showed that supplementation of the diet with vitamins had little effect on their general health. The studies also showed serendipitously that children from a poorer area of Cambridge were shorter and lighter, and had lower haemoglobin levels and a weaker grip, than those from a wealthier area. Moreover, children from three industrial towns in Scotland were, on average, inferior in the same four measurements to the average Cambridge child, and the children from the poorer families in the Scottish towns were inferior in these measurements to those from the wealthier families.

These findings probably helped to persuade Yudkin that nutrition was not only a biological science but also had important social and economic components and implications. In 1942 he wrote an article in The Times (published anonymously, as was customary in those days) pointing out that there were a large number of organisations in the UK concerned in some way with nutrition – the Ministry of Food, the Ministry of Health, the Medical Research Council, the Cabinet Advisory Board on Food Policy, etc. – but no single body responsible for formulating a uniform plan for nutrition. What was needed was a UK Nutrition Council with oversight of food policy.

During the Second World War, Yudkin served in the Royal Army Medical Corps and was posted to Sierra Leone. While there he studied a skin disease that was prevalent among local African soldiers and discovered that it was due not to an infection, as had been believed, but to riboflavin deficiency. He found that the Army had devised a uniform diet for its soldiers in the four British West African colonies (Gambia, Sierra Leone, Gold Coast and Nigeria). This diet was, on paper, adequate in all nutrients – including riboflavin, which was supplied predominantly from millet. But it turned out that millet, although a staple in the Gold Coast and Nigeria, was loathed by soldiers from Sierra Leone, who would not eat it even if they were hungry.

In 1945, shortly after the end of the war, he was elected to the Chair of Physiology at Queen Elizabeth College in London (then the King's College of Household and Social Science). Over the next several years, under his leadership, the college and the University of London established a BSc degree in nutrition (the first degree in nutrition in any European university). Students were taught an integrated series of courses including not only chemistry, physics and biology but also relevant elements of demography, sociology, economics and psychology. The first students were admitted in 1953, and in 1954 the Department of Nutrition was officially opened and Yudkin's Chair was converted into a Professorship of Nutrition. During the following years the department won an international reputation not only for the strength of its research in the physiological and biochemical aspects of the subject, but also for work in such topics as nutrition in the elderly, food surveys in defined populations and the psychology of food choice, and it attracted numerous students from outside the UK, many of them from developing countries.

Yudkin's publications from the department showed an unusual breadth of interests, including (in addition to biochemistry) further studies of adaptive enzymes, nutrition and public health, diseases of affluence, food choice both in human beings and in experimental animals, and historical aspects of the human diet. But his concern became increasingly focused on two topics: the treatment of overweight and the harmful effects of excessive sugar (sucrose) consumption.

The end of food rationing early in the 1950s brought with it an increase in the number of people who were suffering from obesity, and by 1958 slimming diets had proliferated, many of them with no scientific basis. Yudkin showed that in most patients weight could be well controlled by restricting dietary carbohydrate. This Slimming Business (1958), which expressed this idea in user-friendly language, proved popular: it was republished in paperback in 1962, reached its fourth edition in 1974, reappeared as Lose Weight, Feel Great in the US, was translated into Dutch and Hungarian, and spawned The Slimmer's Cook Book in 1961 and The Complete Slimmer in 1964.

Yudkin's interest in sugar arose indirectly from his studies of the alarming increase in many countries during the first half of the twentieth century in the incidence of coronary thrombosis. This increase was of great concern to health professionals, and it was widely attributed to an increase in the amount of fat, or of a particular type of fat, in the diet. In a paper published in 1957 Yudkin analysed diets and coronary mortality in different countries for the year 1952, and also analysed trends in diet, and trends in coronary mortality, in the UK between 1928 and 1954. The first of these analyses produced no evidence for the view that total fat, or animal fat, or hydrogenated fat, was the direct cause of coronary thrombosis; in fact the closest relationship between coronary deaths and any single dietary factor was with sugar. The second analysis, that of historical trends in the UK, found no good relationship with any single dietary factor. Instead, it suggested that some change or changes in lifestyle during the past several decades was contributing to the increased incidence of coronary deaths. One obvious change was reduced exercise, and another was alterations in diet.

Given the dramatic increase in sugar consumption during the first half of the century, Yudkin started to suspect that excessive sugar in the diet might contribute not only to obesity but also to coronary heart disease. Studying historical data from many different countries, he found that increasing prosperity leads to an increase in sugar consumption, particularly in manufactured foods, and also that the ready availability of sugar-containing manufactured foods even in the poorer countries may lead to their being bought in preference to more nutritious food. In 1964 he wrote 'In the wealthier countries, there is evidence that sugar and sugar-containing foods contribute to several diseases, including obesity, dental caries, diabetes mellitus and myocardial infarction [heart attack]'. Investigating whether any link between sugar consumption and disease could be shown in individual patients, he and his associates in the Department of Nutrition found that patients with atherosclerotic disease (a frequent precursor of coronary heart disease) consumed significantly more sucrose than control patients.

An obstacle to the acceptance of these ideas was the belief at the time that sugar and starch were metabolised in the same way, so that one would expect no difference in their effects. Yudkin and his associates, however, fed both experimental animals and human volunteers with differing quantities of sugar and starch, and found major differences between the two carbohydrates in their metabolic effects. Unlike his colleague Thomas L. Cleave, Yudkin believed sugar was more harmful than refined grains and refused to use the term "refined carbohydrates" because it gave "the impression that white flour has the same ill effects as sugar". As early as 1967 Yudkin suggested that the excessive consumption of sugar might result in a disturbance in the secretion of insulin, and that this in turn might contribute to atherosclerosis and diabetes.

== Pure, White and Deadly ==
=== Background ===
Yudkin's Pure, White, and Deadly (1972) was written for a lay readership. Its intention was to summarise the evidence that the consumption of sugar was leading to a greatly increased incidence of coronary thrombosis; that it was certainly involved in dental caries, probably involved in obesity, diabetes and liver disease, and possibly involved in gout, dyspepsia and some cancers. The book drew on studies from Yudkin's own department and other biochemical and epidemiological research in the UK and elsewhere. Pure, White and Deadly was extremely successful. It appeared as Sweet and Dangerous in the US, and was translated into Finnish, German, Hungarian, Italian, Japanese and Swedish. A revised and expanded edition was published in 1986.

The last paragraph of Chapter 1 begins "I hope that when you have read this book I shall have convinced you that sugar is really dangerous." The message was extremely unwelcome to the sugar industry and manufacturers of processed foods. These firms employed a number of methods to impede Yudkin's work. The final chapter of Pure, White and Deadly lists several examples of attempts to interfere with the funding of his research and to prevent its publication. It also refers to the rancorous language and personal smears that Ancel Keys — the American epidemiologist who had proposed that saturated fat was the primary cause of heart disease — employed to dismiss the evidence that sugar was the true culprit. Keys wrote, for example:

It is clear that Yudkin has no theoretical basis or experimental evidence to support his claim for a major influence of dietary sucrose in the etiology of CHD; his claim that men who have CHD are excessive sugar eaters is nowhere confirmed but is disproved by many studies superior in methodology and/or magnitude to his own; and his "evidence" from population statistics and time trends will not bear up under the most elementary critical examination. But the propaganda keeps on reverberating ...

The efforts of the food industry to discredit the case against sugar were largely successful, and by the time of Yudkin's death in 1995 his warnings were, for the most part, no longer being taken seriously. Despite the criticism that he had "no theoretical basis" to support his claims, following a successful publication of his book in America, the McGovern Guidelines for US dietary goals recommended, in 1977, a reduction in sugar intake "by 40 percent," and the US-published guidelines in 1980 prominently advised "don't eat too much sugar."

=== Republication ===
In 2009 Robert Lustig, a pediatric endocrinologist of the University of California, San Francisco, with a special interest in childhood obesity, made a video, Sugar: The Bitter Truth. Lustig and his colleagues had discovered, independently of Yudkin's work, that sugar has serious deleterious effects, particularly in the etiology of diabetes and obesity. In his video, Lustig referred to his re-discovery of and admiration for Yudkin's research. The popularity of the video, which has been viewed 24 million times (as of May, 2024), has contributed to a resurgence of interest in Yudkin's research.

Pure, White and Deadly was republished in 2012, 40 years after its first appearance, with an introduction by Lustig, and subsequently translated into German and Korean. Articles on Yudkin's work, and the way in which the food industry denigrated and obstructed his research, have appeared in the lay press and in television programmes in the UK, Australia and Canada. His arguments and evidence for the dangers of sugar were the focus of several articles in the British Medical Journal on 19 January 2013.

== Later life ==
Yudkin retired from his Professorship in 1971 and left the college in 1974. He continued to write research papers and books. This Nutrition Business appeared in 1976 (and was later translated into Spanish), A–Z of Slimming in 1977, Eat Well, Slim Well in 1982, The Penguin Encyclopedia of Nutrition in 1985 (later translated into French), and The Sensible Person's Guide to Weight Control in 1990. He also continued to write popular articles in lay magazines, having by now become a household name. Having been interested in Israel for many years – soon after its foundation in 1948 he had been asked to advise on the nutritional problems experienced by the new state – he continued in his retirement as an active Governor of the Hebrew University of Jerusalem. He also began to collect antiquarian books, specialising in medicine, nutrition and the culinary arts; after his death much of his collection was given to the National Library of Israel, Jerusalem. He died in London on 12 July 1995.

== Selected works ==
Books by John Yudkin alone

- Yudkin, John (1958). This Slimming Business. London: MacGibbon and Kee. OCLC 1438051.
- — (1964). The Complete Slimmer. London: MacGibbon and Kee. OCLC 6577528.
- — (1972). Pure, White and Deadly: The Problem of Sugar. London: Davis-Poynter. ISBN 978-0-7067-0056-5. OCLC 571307.
- — (1976). This Nutrition Business. Sevenoaks: Teach Yourself Books. ISBN 978-0-312-80055-0. OCLC 3168592.
- — (1977). A–Z of slimming. London: Davis-Poynter. ISBN 978-0-7067-0213-2. OCLC 3868327.
- — (1982). Eat Well, Slim Well. London: Collins and Davis-Poynter. ISBN 978-0-00-216396-5. OCLC 16552964.
- — (1985). The Penguin Encyclopaedia of Nutrition. Harmondsworth: Viking. ISBN 978-0-670-80111-4. OCLC 12096288.
- — (1990). The Sensible Person's Guide to Weight Control. London: Smith-Gordon. ISBN 978-1-85463-043-8. OCLC 59832913.

Books written or edited by Yudkin and others

- Yudkin, John; Chappell, G. M. (1961). The Slimmer's Cookbook. London: MacGibbon and Kee.
- —; McKenzie, J. C., eds. (1964). Changing Food Habits. London: MacGibbon and Kee.
- —, ed. (1966). Our Changing Fare: Two Hundred Years of British Food Habits. London: MacGibbon and Kee.
- —; Barker, T. C.; Oddy, D. J. (1970). The Dietary Surveys of Dr Edward Smith 1862–3. London: Queen Elizabeth College.
- —; Edelman, J.; Hough, L., eds. (1971). Sugar. London: Butterworths.
- —; Barker, T. C., eds. (1971). Fish in Britain. London: Queen Elizabeth College.
- —; Burland, W. L.; Samuel, P. D., eds. (1974). Obesity Symposium. Edinburgh: Churchill Livingstone.
- —, ed. (1978). Diet of Man: Needs and Wants. London: Applied Science Publishers.

== See also ==
- Frederick J. Stare
- D. Mark Hegsted
