= Pennock v. Dialogue =

- Supreme Court of the United States

Argued January 21, 1829 Decided January 26, 1829
- Full case name: Abraham L. Pennock & James Sellers, Plaintiffs in Error v. Adam Dialogue
- Citations: 27 U.S. 1 (more) 2 Pet. 1; 7 L. Ed. 327; 1829 U.S. LEXIS 388

Court membership
- Chief Justice John Marshall Associate Justices Bushrod Washington · William Johnson; Gabriel Duvall · Joseph Story; Smith Thompson

Case opinion
- Majority: Story, joined by unanimous

Pennock v. Dialogue, 27 U.S. (2 Pet.) 1 (1829), was a United States Supreme Court decision in which the Court held invalid a patent on a method of making hose, because the inventor had commercially exploited the invention for years before filing the patent application. The case has been cited many times for the proposition that the U.S. patent system was not established for the purpose of enriching inventors or their financiers but rather for the purpose of furthering the public interest by stimulating technological progress.

== Background ==
Abraham L. Pennock and James Sellers in 1811 invented "an improvement in making leather hose or tubes for conveying water and other fluids; and they are constructed by lapping their edges over, and fastening them by metallic rivets and burs, so as to be rendered water proof, and capable of resisting a heavy pressure of that fluid." In 1818 they obtained a patent, but in the period before they applied for the patent they caused upwards of 13,000 feet of fire hose to be made and sold by a licensee Jenkins.

Pennock and Sellers sued Adam Dialogue in the circuit court in Philadelphia for infringing their patent, and the jury returned a verdict for the defendant Dialogue. Pennock and Sellers then appealed to the Supreme Court.

== Ruling of Supreme Court ==
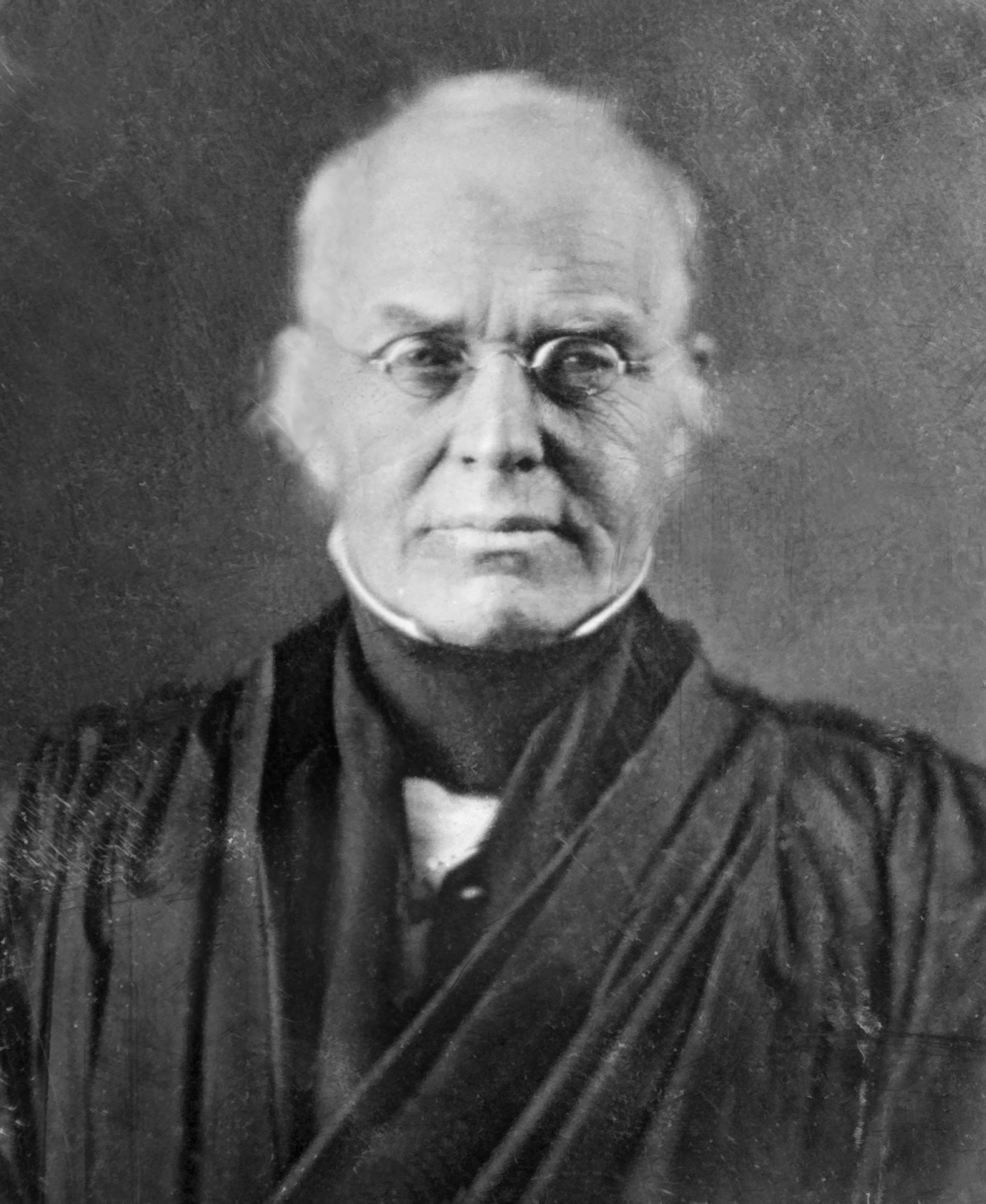
Justice Joseph Story

Justice Joseph Story wrote the opinion for a unanimous Court. He began his analysis by explaining that "many of the provisions of our patent act are derived from the principles and practice which have prevailed in the construction of that of England." Although the 1624 Statute of Monopolies is not identical with the U.S. statute, "the construction of it adopted by the English courts, and the principles and practice which have long regulated the grants of their patents, as they must have been known and are tacitly referred to in some of the provisions of our own statute," are instructive for us.

The main object of the patent system was "to promote the progress of science and useful arts." Story then asked how this object could best be accomplished, and explained that Pennock's seven years of commercial exploitation of the invention before filing a patent application was inconsistent with that:

[T]this could be done best, by giving the public at large a right to make, construct, use, and vend the thing invented, at as early a period as possible, having a due regard to the rights of the inventor. If an inventor should be permitted to hold back from the knowledge of the public the secrets of his invention; if he should for a long period of years retain the monopoly, and make, and sell his invention publicly, and thus gather the whole profits of it, relying upon his superior skill and knowledge of the structure, and then, and then only, when the danger of competition should force him to secure the exclusive right, he should be allowed to take out a patent and thus exclude the public from any further use than what should be derived under it during his fourteen years, it would materially retard the progress of science and the useful arts and give a premium to those who should be least prompt to communicate their discoveries.

Accordingly, it would not be unreasonable for a patent law to "withhold from an inventor the privilege of an exclusive right unless he should, as early as he should allow the public use, put the public in possession of his secret and commence the running of the period that should limit that right." Such a provision should be in the statute, and if not there should be in the case law. Story found such case law in the jurisprudence surrounding the Statute of Monopolies, which is limited to "new manufactures" that "others, at the time of making such letters patent and grants, shall not use." Lord Coke, in his commentary upon this said that "if any other did use it at the making of the letters patent, or grant of the privilege, it [the patent] is declared and enacted to be void," and Story quoted English case law that held, "The public sale of that which is afterwards made the subject of a patent, though sold by the inventor only, makes the patent void."

Story then concluded that the U.S. statute should be interpreted to the same effect. That is:

[T]he first inventor cannot acquire a good title to a patent; if he suffers the thing invented to go into public use or to be publicly sold for use before he makes application for a patent. His voluntary act or acquiescence in the public sale and use is an abandonment of his right, or rather creates a disability to comply with the terms and conditions on which alone the Secretary of State is authorized to grant him a patent.

Therefore, Pennock's patent was void.

== Subsequent developments ==
The Supreme Court has repeatedly cited Pennock v. Dialogue as authority that the public interest is the principal concern under the patent law, rather than the creation of private gain. For example:

- "It is the public interest which is dominant in the patent system. Pennock v. Dialogue, 2 Pet. 1. – Mercoid Corp. v. Mid-Continent Inv. Co., 320 U.S. 661, 665 (1944).
- "As stated by Mr. Justice Story in Pennock v. Dialogue, 2 Pet. 1, 19, the promotion of the progress of science and the useful arts is the 'main object'; reward of inventors is secondary and merely a means to that end." – United States v. Masonite Corp., 316 U.S. 265, 278 (1942).
- "Since Pennock v. Dialogue, 2 Pet. 1, was decided in 1829, this Court has consistently held that the primary purpose of our patent laws is not the creation of private fortunes for the owners of patents, but is 'to promote the progress of science and the useful arts.' " – Motion Picture Patents Co. v. Universal Film Manufacturing Co., 243 U.S. 502, 511 (1917).
- Justice Brandeis and Chief Justice Stone "followed in the early tradition of those who read the Constitution to mean that the public interest in patents comes first, reward to the inventor second." – Automatic Radio Mfg. Co. v. Hazeltine Research, Inc., 339 U.S. 827, 837 (1950) (dissenting opinion of Douglas, J).
- "The patent is a privilege 'conditioned by a public purpose.' Mercoid Corp. v. Mid-Continent Co., 320 U.S. 661, 666. The public purpose is 'to promote the progress of science and useful arts.' The exclusive right of the inventor is but the means to that end. That was early recognized by this Court. See Pennock v. Dialogue, 2 Pet. 1, 19. – Special Equip. Co. v. Coe, 324 U.S. 370, 382 (1945) (dissenting opinion of Douglas, J).
