= Willson v. Black-Bird Creek Marsh Co. =

- Supreme Court of the United States

Decided March 20, 1829
- Full case name: Thomas Willson and Others, Plaintiffs in Error v. The Black Bird Creek Marsh Company, Defendants
- Citations: 27 U.S. 245 (more) 2 Pet. 245; 7 L. Ed. 412

Holding
- As long as Congress has not exercised its power over commerce in a certain area, a state may regulate that area as long as such regulations do not conflict with the Dormant Commerce Clause of the U.S. Constitution.

Court membership
- Chief Justice John Marshall Associate Justices Bushrod Washington · William Johnson; Gabriel Duvall · Joseph Story; Smith Thompson

Case opinion
- Majority: Marshall, joined by unanimous

Laws applied
- Commerce Clause

Willson v. Black-Bird Creek Marsh Co., 27 U.S. (2 Pet.) 245 (1829), was a significant United States Supreme Court case regarding the definition of the Commerce Clause in Article 1 sec. 8, cl. 3 of the U.S. Constitution.

== Background ==
Willson, the owner of a sloop who was licensed under federal navigation laws, the Sally, broke through a dam that blocked his passage which was built by the Black-Bird Creek Marsh Co. and had been authorized to do so by Delaware law. The company brought a case against Willson, claiming Delaware authorized the building of the dam on the Blackbird Creek through a law which was passed under the police power of the state in order to clean up a health hazard and there was no legislation by Congress dealing with the same subject matter. Willson claimed that the law authorizing the building of the dam was a violation of the commerce clause. He believed he had a constitutional right to navigating coastal streams and Delaware's actions were motivated by private profits.

== Opinion ==
Chief Justice John Marshall affirmed the lower court's decision, that because no federal law dealt specifically with the situation, and the state law did not violate Congress' Dormant Commerce Clause power, the state law was valid. He did note, however, that the dam might interfere with interstate commerce.

== See also ==
- List of United States Supreme Court cases, volume 27

== Bibliography ==
- Jean Edward Smith, John Marshall: Definer Of A Nation, New York: Henry Holt & Company, 1996.
- Gillman, Howard, Graber, Mark, and Keith Whittington, American Constitutionalism, New York: Oxford University Press, 2013.
