= Foster v. Neilson =

- Supreme Court of the United States

Decided March 9, 1829
- Full case name: Foster v. Neilson
- Citations: 27 U.S. 253 (more)

Holding
- Certain treaties ratified by the United States, even if otherwise valid and in force, cannot be given effect domestically without a specific act of Congress.

Court membership
- Chief Justice John Marshall Associate Justices Bushrod Washington · William Johnson; Gabriel Duvall · Joseph Story; Smith Thompson

Case opinion
- Majority: Marshall, joined by unanimous

Laws applied
- Treaty of Amity and Commerce between Japan and the United States

Foster v. Neilson, 27 U.S. 253 (1829) was a decision by the United States Supreme Court that held certain treaties ratified by the United States, even if otherwise valid and in force, cannot be given effect domestically without a specific act of Congress. The ruling articulated a more restrictive interpretation of the Supremacy Clause of the U.S. Constitution, which automatically grants treaties the force of domestic federal law.

The Foster decision was the first to formulate the concept of "self-execution", which distinguishes between treaties that are "self-executing" (meaning domestic courts can enforce them directly upon their ratification) and those that are "non-self-executing" (which are not directly enforceable in U.S. courts unless Congress passes specific implementing legislation). It was also the first time the Court applied the "intent-based doctrine of self-execution", which examines the text of a treaty, as well as its related documents and negotiations, to determine whether the treaty makers intended it to be self-executing.

== Decision ==
The Court's opinion, authored by Chief Justice John Marshall, recognized that the U.S. Constitution, through the Supremacy Clause, "declares a treaty to be the law of the land" and "consequently to be regarded in courts of justice as equivalent to an act of the legislature." However, Justice Marshall immediately adds a qualifying statement that a treaty is only the equivalent of a legislative act when the treaty "operates of itself without the aid of any legislative provision"' when the terms of the treaty "import a contract" or suggest that some future legislative act is necessary, "the treaty addresses itself to the political, not the judicial department; and the legislature must execute the contract before it can become a rule for the Court."

Using this test, the Foster Court held that the treaty provision at issue—which stated that certain land grants from the King of Spain "shall be ratified and confirmed"—was non-self-executing because it suggested that Congress would ratify the land grants through a future legislative act.
