= Pure, White and Deadly =

Book on health problems from sugar consumption

- US First edition (original title)
- Author: John Yudkin
- Original title: Sweet and Dangerous
- Language: English
- Subject: Health effects of sugar
- Published: (1972) as Sweet and Dangerous. Peter H. Wyden, New York.; (1972) as Pure, White and Deadly: The Problem of Sugar. Davis-Poynter, London.; (1986) as Pure, White and Deadly. Viking Press, London.; (2012) as Pure, White and Deadly: How Sugar Is Killing Us and What We Can Do to Stop It. Penguin Books, London.
- Publication place: United States
- Media type: Print and digital
- Pages: 164 (1972); 200 (1986); 224 (2012)
- ISBN: 978-0-241-96528-3 (Penguin Books, 2012)
- OCLC: 823655490

Pure, White and Deadly is a 1972 book by John Yudkin, a British nutritionist and former Chair of Nutrition at Queen Elizabeth College, London. Published in New York, it was the first publication by a scientist to anticipate the adverse health effects, especially in relation to obesity and heart disease, of the public's increased sugar consumption. At the time of publication, Yudkin sat on the advisory panel of the British Department of Health's Committee on the Medical Aspects of Food and Nutrition Policy (COMA). He stated his intention in writing the book in the last paragraph of the first chapter: "I hope that when you have read this book I shall have convinced you that sugar is really dangerous."

The book and author suffered a barrage of criticism at the time, particularly from the sugar industry, processed-food manufacturers, and Ancel Keys, an American physiologist who argued in favour of restricting dietary fat, not sugar, and who sought to ridicule Yudkin's work. In later years, Yudkin's observations came to be accepted. (Note: George A. Bray (Journal of Diabetes Science and Technology, 2010): "The worldwide consumption of sucrose, and thus fructose, has risen logarithmically since 1800. Many concerns about the health hazards of calorie-sweetened beverages, including soft drinks and fruit drinks and the fructose they provide, have been voiced over the past 10 years. These concerns are related to higher energy intake, risk of obesity, risk of diabetes, risk of cardiovascular disease, risk of gout in men, and risk of metabolic syndrome. Fructose appears to be responsible for most of the metabolic risks, including high production of lipids, increased thermogenesis, and higher blood pressure associated with sugar or high fructose corn syrup. Some claim that sugar is natural, but natural does not assure safety.") A 2002 cover story about sugar by Gary Taubes in The New York Times Magazine, "What if It's All Been a Big Fat Lie?", attracted attention, and the following year a World Health Organization report recommended that added sugars provide no more than 6–10% of total dietary intake. In 2009 a lecture on the health effects of sugar by Robert Lustig, an American pediatric endocrinologist, went viral. The subsequent interest led to the rediscovery of Yudkin's book and the rehabilitation of his reputation.

Two further editions of the book were published, the second after Yudkin's death in 1995. An expanded version appeared in 1986, revised by Yudkin himself, to include much additional research evidence. In 2012 the book was re-published by Penguin Books with a new introduction by Robert Lustig to reflect the changed nutritional context that the book had helped to create.

== Synopsis ==
=== 1972 edition ===
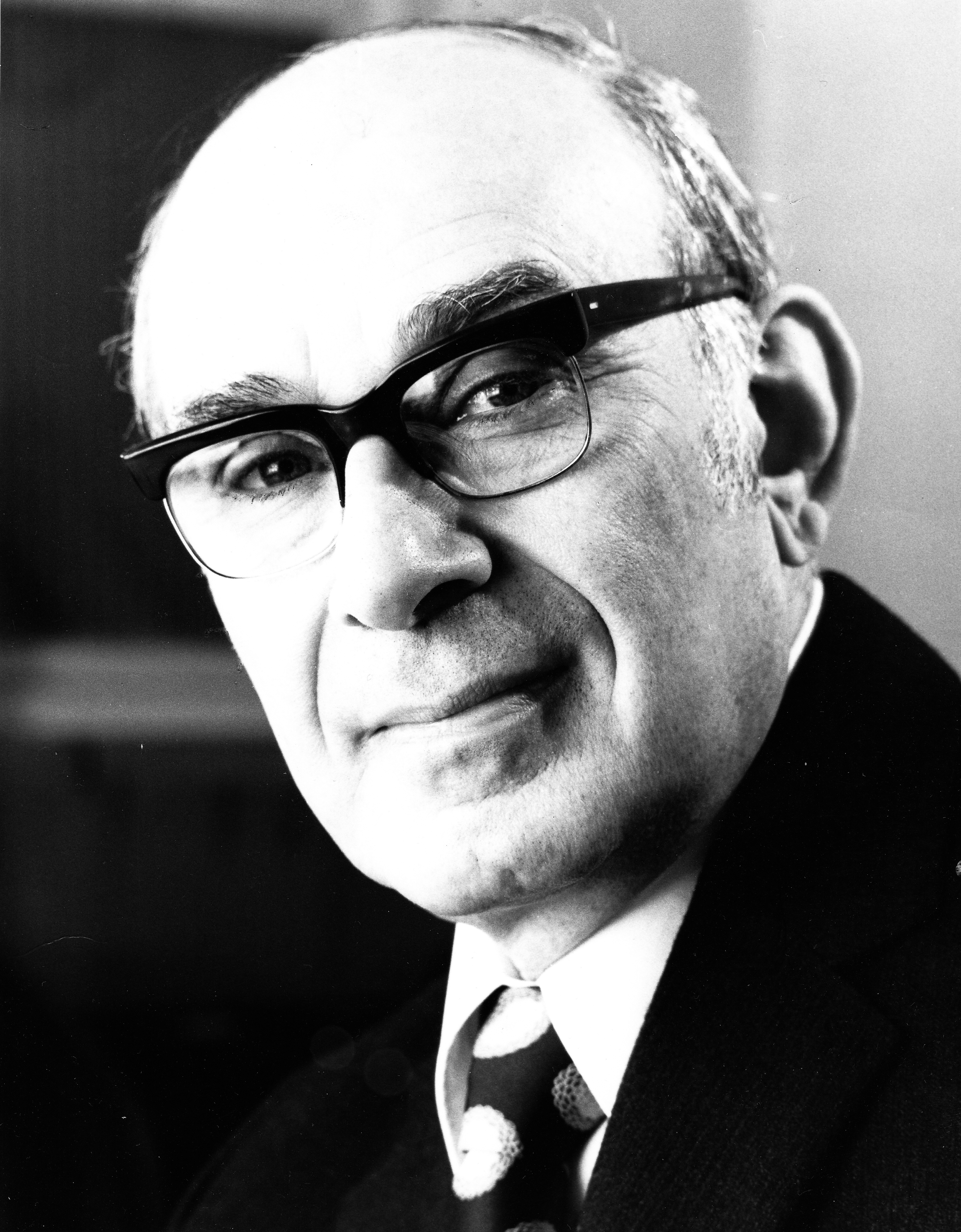
John Yudkin, c. 1970

The book was first published in 1972 in New York by the publisher Peter H. Wyden under the title Sweet and Dangerous, and a few weeks later in London by Davis-Poynter as Pure, White and Deadly: The Problem of Sugar. Pure, White and Deadly was used for subsequent editions and is the title by which the book became known.

At the time of publication, it was generally accepted that the alarming recent increase in the incidence of coronary heart disease (CHD) was due to the excessive consumption of animal fat. Yudkin believed that this view was wrong and that, instead, an important cause of CHD was the excessive consumption of sugar (i.e. sucrose). More generally, he argued, excessive sucrose consumption provokes a metabolic disturbance that has several undesirable results.

The author makes the initial case that sucrose is a dangerous food by emphasising the contrast between starch and sucrose. Both of these are carbohydrates, but starch occurs as a bulk constituent of cereals (such as rice, wheat and maize), legumes and a few root crops like potatoes, while sucrose is present in large quantities in sugar cane, sugar beet and ripe fruits. It used to be thought that sucrose and starch are metabolised in similar ways, and so are interchangeable from the nutritional point of view, but more recent evidence had shown that their metabolism is significantly different. The need for carbohydrate as a component of the diet can be entirely satisfied by starch (often in the form of bread or pasta), which is broken down in the body to glucose. On the other hand sucrose, which is broken down to equal quantities of glucose and fructose, is not an essential dietary component even in small amounts. Evolutionary history suggests that our pre-Neolithic ancestors ate a diet that consisted largely of meat, with some nuts, berries, leaves and root vegetables, and we can presume that a taste for sweet fruit developed because it directed people to a rich source of vitamin C, an essential nutrient.

The development of agriculture during the Neolithic Revolution (from c. 10,000 BCE) led to a large increase in the consumption of starch, to which humanity adapted well. By contrast, it is only since the early 19th century that greatly improved methods of cultivation of sugar cane and sugar beet, and improved technology of refining, led to sucrose becoming readily available and remarkably cheap. Yudkin refers to these developments as the separation of palatability from nutritional value. As a result the quantity consumed has increased about 50-fold in the past 150 years, with sucrose increasingly used not only in the home and in cafés but also by the manufacturers of soft drinks and as a sweetening agent for many pre-prepared foods. The human species has not had time to adapt to this extremely rapid change. Three problems result. First, unlike glucose, which is metabolised throughout the body, the fructose produced from the breakdown of sucrose is metabolised almost exclusively in the liver, where much of it is converted to fat. Secondly, since it is not uncommon for people to take as much as 30% of their daily caloric intake as sucrose, this consumption crowds out more desirable foods and can sometimes lead to deficiencies of certain nutrients. Thirdly, since many people find sucrose appetising, it is often taken in excess of caloric requirements, thus leading to obesity.

The author then turns to the evidence that the consumption of sucrose is associated with certain specific disorders other than obesity. Some of this evidence is epidemiological and some experimental. Both types have limitations, which the author discusses in a chapter called Can you prove it?, but both are strongly indicative of an involvement of sucrose in the aetiology both of CHD and of what used to be called maturity-onset diabetes (type 2 diabetes).

The epidemiological evidence that sucrose contributes to CHD had started to accumulate in 1957; in that year Yudkin showed that a comparison of data from several countries indicated an association between coronary mortality and the consumption of sucrose, and that the association with sucrose consumption was stronger than with fat consumption. Subsequent studies from South Africa and Israel found that sub-populations that had historically consumed only small quantities of sucrose had much less CHD than those who consumed large quantities, but that as their sucrose consumption increased so too did their incidence of CHD. Experimental evidence from animal studies showed that consumption of a sugar-rich diet leads to biochemical changes that are associated with CHD, such as an increase in blood triglyceride, an increase in platelet stickiness, and an accumulation of fat in the liver. Results similar to some of these were found in human subjects.

Epidemiological evidence similarly pointed to excess sugar consumption as a contributory factor in the development of type 2 diabetes. As before, the evidence relied on a comparison between different countries in the incidence of type 2 diabetes and the consumption of sucrose, and also on within-country differences between sub-populations that consumed less or more sucrose. Moreover, in developed countries, the increase in sucrose consumption that had occurred over the past several decades appeared to run parallel to the increase in the incidence of type 2 diabetes. Experiments with rats showed that the feeding of sucrose led to impaired glucose tolerance (results with human subjects were more equivocal). The author mentions several other conditions that he believed were caused by or exacerbated by the consumption of sucrose: dyspepsia (indigestion), dental caries, seborrhoeic dermatitis, changes in the refractive index of the eye, and various forms of cancer. With the exception of dental caries, none of these conditions showed as strong a link with sucrose consumption as CHD and type 2 diabetes did.

How does the consumption of sucrose lead to these deleterious effects? For dental caries the answer is clear: it is converted to dextran, which is extremely adhesive and promotes the growth of acid-producing bacteria. For the general metabolic effects that lead to CHD and/or to type 2 diabetes, the author suggests that alterations either in the rate of production of insulin or in the body’s sensitivity to it may be one of the early effects of excessive sucrose consumption. This suggestion foreshadows the subsequent widespread recognition of insulin resistance and the metabolic syndrome, and the condition known as non-alcoholic fatty liver disease (NAFLD). NAFLD is believed to result from the accumulation of fat in the liver—often as a consequence of excess dietary sucrose.

A chapter called Sugar should be banned suggests that sooner or later legislation will be needed to prevent people from consuming so much sucrose (this time foreshadowing the UK’s Soft Drinks Industry Levy or "sugar tax"). Yudkin concludes his book with some examples of the ways in which organisations connected with the sugar industry, and with the manufacturers of processed foods that use sugar, sought to interfere with his research or with its publication.

=== 1986 edition ===
Fourteen years after the first publication of Pure, White and Deadly, Yudkin decided that the book was out of date in important respects, and in 1986 he published a new edition to incorporate more recent experimental results. The 1986 edition has many more references, and a much fuller index. In Chapter 12 of the new edition (Can you prove it?) he wrote about several experiments with human subjects in which fat intake had been manipulated by the reduction of animal fat; the results had not supported the fat hypothesis. Chapter 14 (Eat sugar and see what happens) described further experiments from Yudkin’s department at Queen Elizabeth College, both with experimental animals and with human volunteers fed on diets rich in sugar. Chapter 17 (A host of diseases) introduced a new section on disease of the liver.

The inclusion of these additional results is one reason why the new edition (published by Viking in 1986 and by Penguin in 1988) is substantially longer than its predecessor. In addition, the author rearranged and expanded a good deal of the material in chapters 3, 4 and 5 of the 1972 edition, so that these three chapters (which largely concerned the chemistry of sucrose, methods for its production, and the difference between white and brown sugar) now became seven. In the last chapter, Yudkin gave many additional examples of the ways in which his research and the publication of his results had been impeded by the sugar industry and by organisations influenced by it.

=== 2012 edition ===
The 2012 edition was published by Penguin under the title Pure, White and Deadly: How Sugar Is Killing Us and What We Can Do to Stop It. Yudkin's text is identical to that of the 1986 edition. In addition the new edition has an introduction by Robert Lustig, who had, independently of Yudkin, discovered some of the deleterious effects of sucrose, particularly in the aetiology of obesity in childhood. This edition of Pure, White and Deadly has been translated into German and Korean.

== Reception ==
After half a century, it has become clear that Pure, White and Deadly was a transformative book, both because it re-shaped the scientific understanding of sugar and because it stimulated practical action for sugar reduction. The initial reception was very different. For decades after the book's initial publication in 1972, despite its sales and translations (into Finnish, German, Hungarian, Italian, Japanese and Swedish), Yudkin's arguments were rejected not just by the food industry but also by most of his scientific peers. Because of the lengthy delay caused by opponents (described below under Rejection), and the further time involved as others slowly began to appreciate the significance of sugar (described under Transition), sugar emerged as the principal nutrient of global concern only in the early years of the 21st century.

=== Rejection ===
When Pure, White and Deadly was first published, Yudkin was a member of the panel on diet and cardiovascular disease of the Committee on the Medical Aspects of Food Policy (COMA), then the principal scientific advisory body on nutrition for the UK government. It seemed an ideal opportunity to translate science into policy. In the event, Yudkin's colleagues on the panel did not accept his arguments, so he wrote a brief “note of reservation” for the final report suggesting they had paid too much attention to fat and too little to sucrose.

That a COMA panel had for the first time been asked to consider cardiovascular disease was itself a sign of the changes with which Pure, White and Deadly was concerned. As wartime privations receded and industrialised nations prospered, diets changed and the focus of nutrition changed too – from deficiency diseases to problems of excess, what Yudkin called the “diseases of civilisation”.

In many countries, governments and medical organisations began publishing dietary recommendations. Some included sugar among their concerns, but without specific reference to Pure, White and Deadly, or to Yudkin at all. Fat remained the principal issue. A review of 100 international nutrition reports up to 1991 found that 70 included quantitative targets for fat and only 23 for sugar.

In the UK, the 1984 update of the COMA report on diet and cardiovascular disease did not mention Pure, White and Deadly or Yudkin. And despite the much expanded 1986 edition of the book with new evidence, the separate COMA panel on “Dietary Sugars and Human Disease” in 1989 explicitly dismissed any links between sugar and obesity, type 2 diabetes or heart disease.

The first WHO report on “Diet, Nutrition and the Prevention of Chronic Diseases” in 1990 acknowledged sugar's role in the causation of dental caries, but not in obesity or CVD. Keys was referenced but not Yudkin. Similarly, the 1994 version of the COMA report on cardiovascular disease lists 414 references, but does not include Pure, White and Deadly among them.

=== Transition ===
For the general public, the most significant development was the increasing popularity of low-carbohydrate diets from the mid-1990s onwards. These created a generalised sense that there was something harmful about sugar and that people should eat less of it.

Low-carbohydrate diets at that time were most strongly associated with Robert Atkins, himself a cardiologist who also suffered rejection by his medical peers. But many others produced variations on the theme, most notably Arthur Agatston, Barry Sears, Michael and Mary Dan Eades, Leslie Kenton, Patrick Holford and Jennie Brand-Miller. The trend continues in the 21st century in varied forms, including ketogenic and paleolithic diets. Yudkin received little acknowledgement for this development, even though he had published five books on weight loss, all emphasising sugar restriction, from 1958 to 1990, before any of the other popular low-carbohydrate diets were written. (See separate Wikipedia entry on John Yudkin for a bibliography).

There was a similar lack of recognition in the scientific community. As we have seen, from the first edition of Pure, White and Deadly onwards Yudkin drew attention to the “metabolic disturbance” caused by excessive sugar intake, i.e. its effect on the production of insulin or on people’s sensitivity to it. But it was Gerald Reaven, another academic medical specialist, whose work stimulated research on and clinical attention to insulin, who later became known as the “father of insulin resistance”. Reaven also linked this condition to broader health consequences, including heart disease, in what was known in those early days as “Syndrome X” (now more formally designated as the metabolic syndrome).

Also food health advocacy NGOs became more visible during the 1990s, raising awareness of dietary problems. Some were particularly active on sugar – notably the Center for Science in the Public Interest (CSPI) in the US and Action and Information on Sugars (AIS) in the UK, now succeeded by the more prominent Action on Sugar (AoS). But even these groups made little public reference to Pure, White and Deadly or to Yudkin.

Throughout this period, both print and broadcast media gave increasing coverage to sugar. But the single most influential article was a cover story on the sugar v fat debate by Gary Taubes in The New York Times Magazine in 2002. His work also encouraged other journalists, including cookery writers, to publish articles on sugar. Today, articles, columns and programmes on sugar have become ubiquitous and are too numerous to count. The Wikipedia article on John Yudkin includes references to several articles on ‘’Pure, White and Deadly’’ in both the medical press and the lay press down to the year 2016. A more recent example, Fat didn’t have a lobby, appeared in December 2017 in Süddeutsche Zeitung Magazin.

The developing case against sugar was also manifest in the 2003 version of WHO's "Diet, Nutrition and the Prevention of Chronic Diseases", which recognised that there were good reasons for restricting sugar intakes to less than 10% of total calories, not just because of dental caries, but “on nutritional grounds alone”. These grounds specifically included obesity. The subsequent controversy with the food industry over the global strategy to achieve this target was a turning point for some companies, who recognised that sugar and sweet products were now irremovably on the nutrition agenda.

The real breakthrough came in 2009 with the lecture “Sugar: the Bitter Truth”, by the paediatric endocrinologist Robert Lustig, broadcast on YouTube and viewed almost eight million times. Lustig's contribution was significant in several ways. First, it drew widespread public attention to the serious scientific case against sugar. It also broadened the nutritional concerns about sugar beyond obesity to all the diseases in the metabolic syndrome. Finally, it recognised the role that Yudkin had played in this long history, and hence was a major inspiration for the re-publication of Pure, White and Deadly in 2012, for which Lustig wrote an introduction. While he came to his clinical understanding of sugar independently, Lustig was more generous than any previous scientific workers in acknowledging his debt to Yudkin. Lustig ends his introduction to Pure, White and Deadly: “I’m proud to be a Yudkin disciple, to contribute to resurrecting his work and his reputation, and to assist in the advancement of his legacy and public health message. Every scientist stands on the shoulders of giants. For a man of relatively diminutive stature and build, Dr John Yudkin was indeed a giant.”

=== Affirmation ===
Two major books have taken up the theme developed by Yudkin: Fat Chance by Robert Lustig (Hudson Street Press, 2013) and The Case Against Sugar by Gary Taubes (Alfred A. Knopf, 2017). These two books have added momentum to Yudkin’s call in Pure, White and Deadly for a substantial reduction in the consumption of sugar.

In recent years, most major multinational food and drink manufacturers have begun implementing “health and wellness” programmes which, amongst other actions, review and reformulate their product portfolios (thousands of products) to reduce sugar. Nestlé, Unilever, Danone, General Mills, Kellogg's, Mars, Kraft Heinz, Mondelez and others have such plans, as well as, most significantly, Coca-Cola and PepsiCo.

The results are variable across companies, markets and product categories, and often criticised as inadequate or too slow. But significant reformulations in foods normally take many years. They have to be done gradually and imperceptibly, so as not to shock people's expectations and so as to carry established customers with them. For example, Heinz UK, an early responder to nutritional concerns, has been cutting sugar gradually across its range since 1986 and is still doing so. Sugar reduction in mass market foods is a transformative process that will take a long time.

Government plans and policies on sugar are also changing. Earlier, the consensus target for sugar consumption was 10% of calories. In 2015, Yudkin's home country, the UK, set a goal of 5% of dietary energy, and WHO made this a “conditional recommendation” for all countries.

Explicit anti-sugar policies are being set in place. The most obvious manifestation has been taxes on “sugar-sweetened beverages”. At the time of writing, some 59 countries have adopted some form of charge on sweetened drinks. This is still a minority among nation states, but the number is growing.

Their effectiveness varies. In many cases the charges are small, the data on sales and consumption are imperfect, and consequently the effects are disputed. The most powerful to date is again in the UK, with the Soft Drinks Industry Levy. It was structured with the intention not of suppressing consumption but of stimulating reformulation. So it took the form of a “levy” on manufacturers, not an excise tax at retail level. It was effective: most mass market drinks have reduced their sugar content to evade the levy.

The UK has also begun a programme to reduce the sugar content in popular sweetened foods (biscuits, breakfast cereals, cakes, chocolate, ice cream, pastries, puddings, sugar confectionery, sweet spreads and yoghurts). It is too early to tell if this will be effective – many lower sugar products are still being developed and, in foods more than in drinks, reformulation is a long process.

The most significant measure of Yudkin's increasing influence has come from the sugar industry itself. In 1964, aware of his arguments even before Pure, White and Deadly was published, the two big UK sugar producers (AB Sugar and Tate & Lyle) set up the Sugar Bureau (later Sugar Nutrition) to provide scientific counter-arguments on the health effects of sugar. In 2016, recognising that the public argument had been lost, they closed it down.

=== Influence ===
Although excessive sugar consumption is recognised as a major health issue, it is likely to remain a problem for decades ahead. The prevalence of obesity remains high in most developed countries. It is also rising in many developing societies, even those with widespread deficiencies, where it produces the “double burden” of malnutrition. As yet, “not one single country has managed to turn around its obesity epidemic in all age groups”. The burden of illness has shifted, in rich and poor countries alike, towards “non-communicable diseases”, including those of the metabolic syndrome associated with sugar.

From a global perspective, sugar consumption is also rising, through growth in Asia and Africa, with India as the world's largest consumer in absolute amounts. It may not be falling even in the UK, despite all the government's efforts. Estimating actual intakes is difficult, because diet surveys are affected by under-reporting.

Sugar production is rising in parallel, not only through more cane and beet, but also because of increased production of high fructose corn syrup/“isoglucose”, made from other starchy crops, like maize and wheat. Indeed, for all the attention to new policies to control demand for sugar, agricultural and trade policies continue to stimulate its production. Nonetheless, the reformulation programmes of governments and companies are meant to gradually reduce consumption.

One consequence of the emphasis on reformulation has been to stimulate the development of new food ingredients that may be used in place of sugar, especially in the technically more difficult changes to foods. These go well beyond the familiar “artificial” sweeteners to include new “natural” sweeteners, superior polyols, better dextrins, improved oligo/poly-saccharides, sweet proteins, flavour enhancers, modifiers of taste receptors, and even new forms of sugar itself.
