= Nasarvanji Hormusji Choksy =

Indian physician and activist (1861–1939)

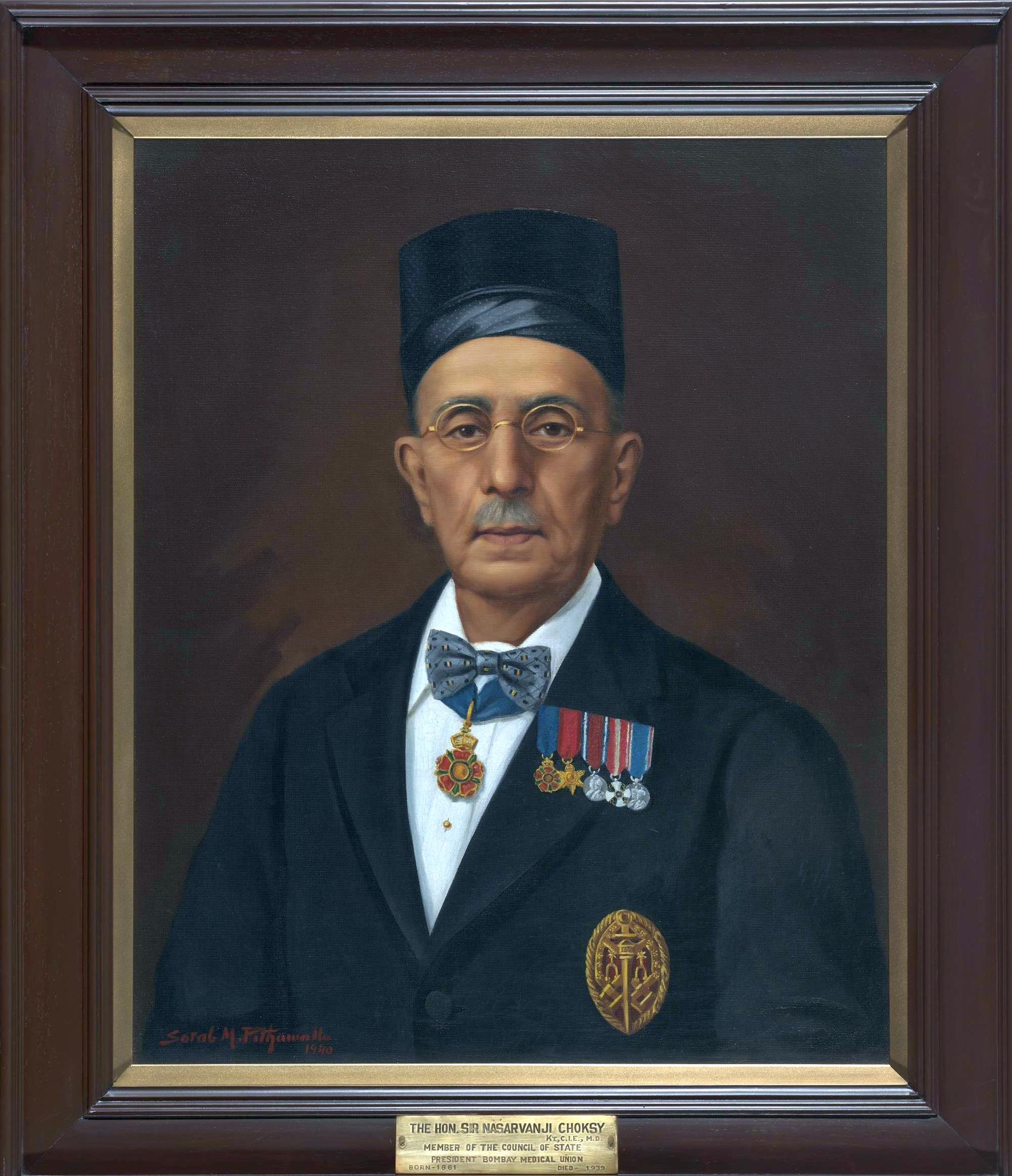
Portrait by Sorab M. Pithawalla, 1940

Sir Nasarvanji Hormusji Choksy (7 October 1861 – 1 December 1939) was an Indian medical doctor who worked in Bombay. He was titled Khan Bahadur and knighted in 1929 for his contributions to public health, particularly for his work in dealing with smallpox, leprosy, tuberculosis, and plague. He contributed to medical advance with his approach to clinical trials in testing plague vaccines.

== Life and work ==
Choksy was born in a Zoroastrian family in Bombay. He was educated at Elphinstone High School and joined Grant Medical College in 1879. He graduated with top honours and became a tutor at the same college in anatomy, Materia Medica and botany from 1884 to 1887 during Henry van Dyke Carter's tenure as principal. He served as secretary to the Indian Factory Commission in 1887 to examine the health and sanitation of mill workers. He was a medical superintendent at the Arthur Road Hospital (now called Kasturba Infectious Diseases Hospital) during the small-pox outbreak in 1888. He examined the efficacy of smallpox vaccination. He served as editor for the Indian Medico-Chirurgical Review from 1893 to 1899. He contracted bubonic plague three times, most seriously in 1904 for which he was administered Alexandre Yersin's serum, the only treatment then available against the plague. While working with the plague commission, he conducted controlled trials on a range of prophylactic and therapeutic agents, including Alessandro Lustig's plague serum. Although he found Lustig's serum more effective than that produced by Yersin or the others including that of Waldemar Haffkine, the government did not choose it due, supposedly, to financial considerations. He supervised the Maratha Plague Hospital between 1902 until his retirement in 1921 managing at least 26 outbreaks of plague, 16 of small-pox, 6 of cholera, and 13 of relapsing fever, in Bombay. He was a nominated member of the Council of State for India from 1921 where he contributed to policy decisions on health and education. Among these was his view that population control measures through education and voluntary means be popularized by non-governmental agencies.

Choksy received the title of Khan Bahadur for his services in 1897. Choksy and the health officer for Bombay, John Andrew Turner (1858-1922), took great interest in public health. Choksy gave public lectures through the Bombay Sanitary Association (founded in 1904). Both Turner and Choksy saw poverty as a root cause of many of the public health issues. Choksy received an honorary MD from the University of Freiburg, a Médaille d'honneur des épidémies in 1906 from France, Chevalier of the Crown of Italy and numerous other honours. Two of his four sons also took up the medical profession.
