= Delaware County Institute of Science =

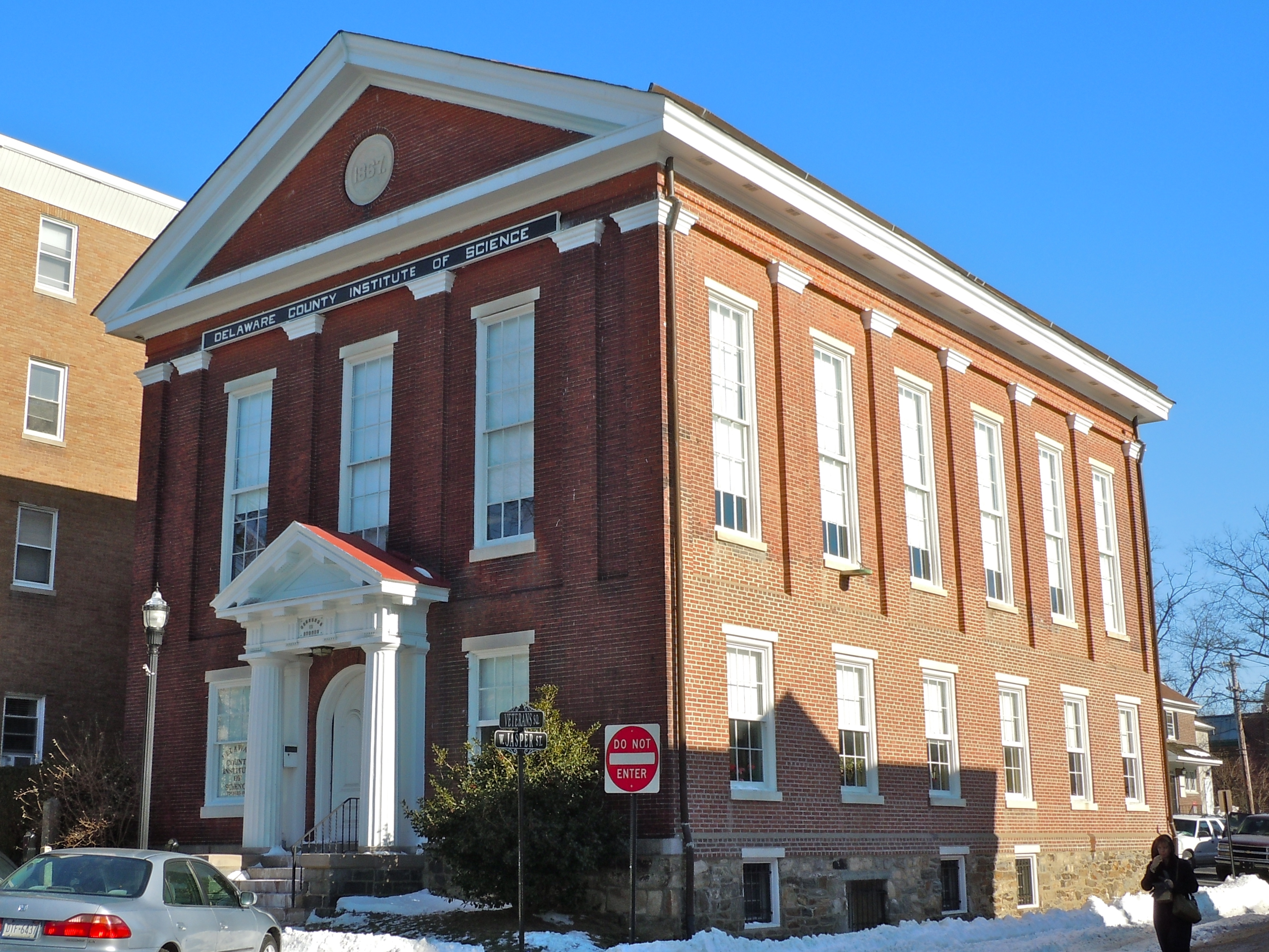
- Established: 1833
- Location: 11 Veterans Square, Media, Pennsylvania
- Type: Science and natural history museum
- Website: www.delcoscience.org

The Delaware County Institute of Science is a science and natural history museum, library and education center in Media, Pennsylvania. It was organized in 1833 and contains exhibits of mounted animals and birds; fossils, shells and corals from around the world; an herbarium; a large collection of minerals; and a reference library and lecture hall for scientific presentations.

== History ==
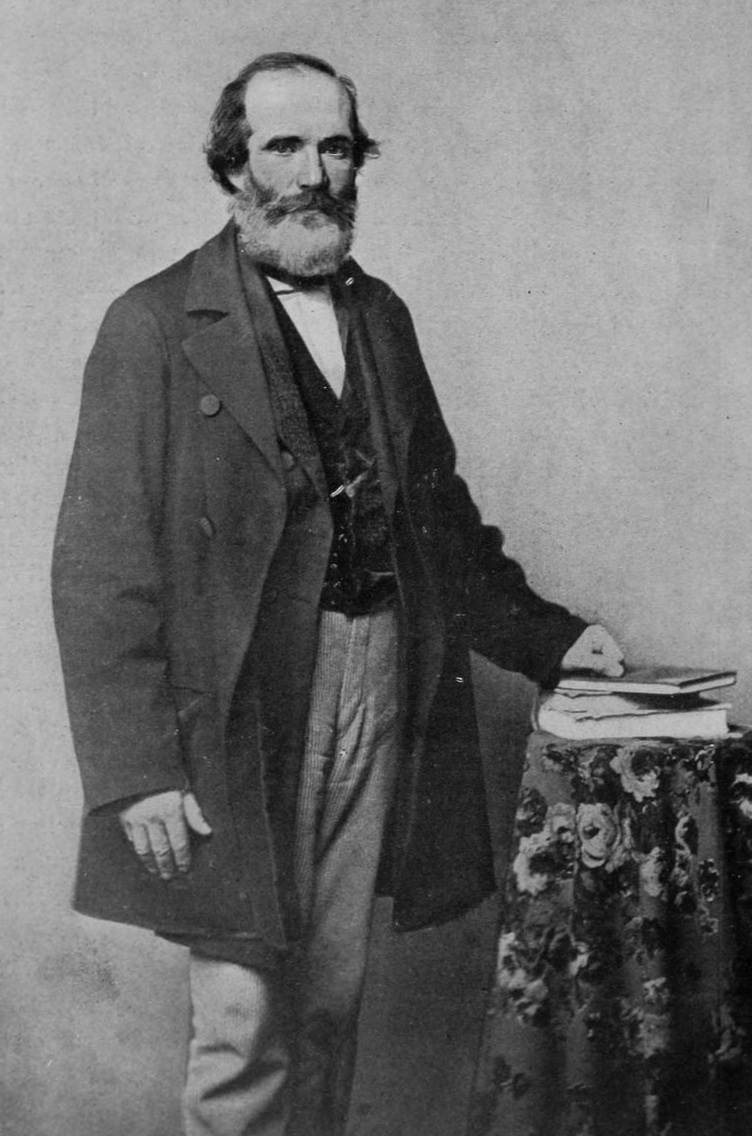
Ornithologist John Cassin was one of the five founders of the Institute in 1833.

In the summer of 1833, five friends met at the public house of Isaac Hall in Nether Providence, Pennsylvania and proposed the development of a scientific organization to be named the "Cabinet of Natural Sciences of Delaware County". The five men were George Miller, John Miller, Minshall Painter, George Smith and the noted ornithologist John Cassin. On September 21, 1833, the group met again and created the organization under the name Delaware County Institute of Science.

On January 4, 1837, George Cummings sold a plot of land near the Rose Tree Tavern in Upper Providence, Pennsylvania and a two-story brick building was constructed. The Institute membership continued to increase and incorporated on February 8, 1836. The building was formally opened in September 1837 with a dedicatory address given by Robert Maskell Patterson, the director of the U.S. Mint in Philadelphia.

Over September 10–12, 1846, the Institute held its first public exhibition of agriculture, manufactures and other products of Delaware County at its hall in Upper Providence. The exhibition continued annually for several years until the Delaware County Agricultural Society was established in 1855 and took over the exhibitions.

In 1867, the current building in Media, Pennsylvania was constructed and the Institute moved to that location. The building was originally intended to house the Media Title and Trust Company on the first floor and the institute on the second floor, but the institute currently occupies the entire building.

Other notable people associated with the Institute include the archeologist Daniel Garrison Brinton and the botanist Graceanna Lewis.

=== Presidents ===
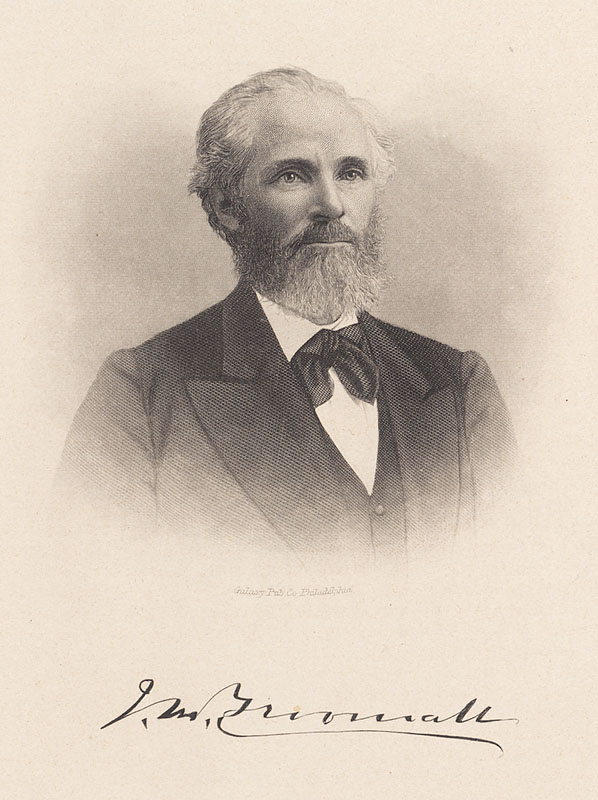
John M. Broomall served as president of the institute from 1882 to 1894

Presidents of the Institute include:

- George Smith, M.D. 1833–1882
- Honorable John M. Broomall 1882–1894
- T. Chalkley Palmer 1894–1934
- George Pennock 1934–1938
- Carolus Broomall 1938–1939
- Walter Palmer 1939–1953
- Harold W. Arndt 1953–1960
- Russell J. Emmons 1960–1963
- William Blake Gibson, M.D. 1963–1990
- Alfred C. Palmer 1990–2012

At least six of the institute's past presidents died in office. Walter Palmer was the son of T. Chalkey Palmer.

== Exhibits ==
The Institute contains exhibits of mounted animals and birds; fossils, shells and corals from around the world; an herbarium; a large collection of minerals and a lecture hall for scientific presentations.

Among the holdings is a rare microscope designed by Joseph Zentmayer that was displayed at the 1876 Centennial Exposition in Philadelphia.

== Library ==
The library at the institute is a non-circulating reference collection. It contains several thousand books and publications on the Natural Sciences as well as a large collection of books on local and Pennsylvania history.

== See also ==
- List of science centers in the United States
