= List of United States Supreme Court cases, volume 27 =

Supreme Court of the United States
- Interactive map of Supreme Court of the United States
- 38°53′26″N 77°00′16″W
- Established: March 4, 1789; 237 years ago
- Location: Washington, D.C.
- Coordinates: 38°53′26″N 77°00′16″W
- Composition method: Presidential nomination with Senate confirmation
- Authorised by: Constitution of the United States, Art. III, § 1
- Judge term length: life tenure, subject to impeachment and removal
- Number of positions: 9 (by statute)
- Website: supremecourt.gov

This is a list of cases reported in volume 27 (2 Pet.) of United States Reports, decided by the Supreme Court of the United States in 1829.

== Nominative reports ==
In 1874, the U.S. government created the United States Reports, and retroactively numbered older privately published case reports as part of the new series. As a result, cases appearing in volumes 1–90 of U.S. Reports have dual citation forms; one for the volume number of U.S. Reports, and one for the volume number of the reports named for the relevant reporter of decisions (these are called "nominative reports").

=== Richard Peters, Jr. ===
Starting with the 26th volume of U.S. Reports, the Reporter of Decisions of the Supreme Court of the United States was Richard Peters Jr. Peters was Reporter of Decisions from 1828 to 1843, covering volumes 26 through 41 of United States Reports which correspond to volumes 1 through 16 of his Peters's Reports. As such, the dual form of citation to, for example, Smith v. Foxall is 27 U.S. (2 Pet.) 595 (1829).

== Justices of the Supreme Court at the time of 27 U.S. (2 Pet.) ==
The Supreme Court is established by Article III, Section 1 of the Constitution of the United States, which says: "The judicial Power of the United States, shall be vested in one supreme Court . . .". The size of the Court is not specified; the Constitution leaves it to Congress to set the number of justices. Under the Judiciary Act of 1789 Congress originally fixed the number of justices at six (one chief justice and five associate justices). Since 1789 Congress has varied the size of the Court from six to seven, nine, ten, and back to nine justices (always including one chief justice).

When the cases in 27 U.S. (2 Pet.) were decided, the Court comprised these six justices (although a seventh justice, John McLean, was confirmed by the United States Senate in March 1829 after the death of Justice Robert Trimble, McLean did not take his seat on the Supreme Court until January 1830 and so did not participate in the decision of cases reported in 27 U.S. (2 Pet.)):

Portrait	Justice	Office	Home State	Succeeded	Date confirmed by the Senate (Vote)	Tenure on Supreme Court
	John Marshall	Chief Justice	Virginia	Oliver Ellsworth	January 27, 1801 (Acclamation)	February 4, 1801 – July 6, 1835 (Died)
	Bushrod Washington	Associate Justice	Virginia	James Wilson	December 20, 1798 (Acclamation)	November 9, 1798 (Recess Appointment) – November 26, 1829 (Died)
	William Johnson	Associate Justice	South Carolina	Alfred Moore	March 24, 1804 (Acclamation)	May 7, 1804 – August 4, 1834 (Died)
	Gabriel Duvall	Associate Justice	Maryland	Samuel Chase	November 18, 1811 (Acclamation)	November 23, 1811 – January 12, 1835 (Resigned)
	Joseph Story	Associate Justice	Massachusetts	William Cushing	November 18, 1811 (Acclamation)	February 3, 1812 – September 10, 1845 (Died)
	Smith Thompson	Associate Justice	New York	Henry Brockholst Livingston	December 9, 1823 (Acclamation)	September 1, 1823 – December 18, 1843 (Died)

== Notable Cases in 27 U.S. (2 Pet.) ==
=== Pennock v. Dialogue ===
In Pennock v. Dialogue, 27 U.S. (2 Pet.) 1 (1829), the Supreme Court held invalid a patent on a method of making hose because the inventor had commercially exploited the invention for years before filing the patent application. The case has been cited many times for the proposition that the U.S. patent system was not established for the purpose of enriching inventors or their financiers but rather for the purpose of furthering the public interest by stimulating technological progress.

=== Willson v. Black-Bird Creek Marsh Co. ===
Willson v. Black-Bird Creek Marsh Co., 27 U.S. (2 Pet.) 245 (1829), was a significant Supreme Court decision regarding the definition of the Commerce Clause in Article 1 sec. 8, cl. 3 of the U.S. Constitution. Willson, the owner of a sloop licensed under federal navigation laws, broke through a dam built by the Black-Bird Creek Marsh Co. that blocked his passage. The company brought a case against Willson, claiming that Delaware authorized the building of the dam through a law which was passed under the police power of the state in order to clean up a health hazard, and there was no legislation by Congress dealing with the same subject matter. Willson claimed that the law authorizing the building of the dam was a violation of the Commerce Clause. He believed he had a constitutional right to navigate coastal streams, and Delaware's actions were motivated by private profits. Chief Justice John Marshall affirmed the lower court's decision, that because no federal law dealt specifically with the situation, and since the Delaware law did not violate Congress' Dormant Commerce Clause power, the state law was valid.

== Citation style ==
Under the Judiciary Act of 1789 the federal court structure at the time comprised District Courts, which had general trial jurisdiction; Circuit Courts, which had mixed trial and appellate (from the US District Courts) jurisdiction; and the United States Supreme Court, which had appellate jurisdiction over the federal District and Circuit courts—and for certain issues over state courts. The Supreme Court also had limited original jurisdiction (i.e., in which cases could be filed directly with the Supreme Court without first having been heard by a lower federal or state court). There were one or more federal District Courts and/or Circuit Courts in each state, territory, or other geographical region.

Bluebook citation style is used for case names, citations, and jurisdictions.

- "C.C.D." = United States Circuit Court for the District of . . .
  - e.g.,"C.C.D.N.J." = United States Circuit Court for the District of New Jersey
- "D." = United States District Court for the District of . . .
  - e.g.,"D. Mass." = United States District Court for the District of Massachusetts
- "E." = Eastern; "M." = Middle; "N." = Northern; "S." = Southern; "W." = Western
  - e.g.,"C.C.S.D.N.Y." = United States Circuit Court for the Southern District of New York
  - e.g.,"M.D. Ala." = United States District Court for the Middle District of Alabama
- "Ct. Cl." = United States Court of Claims
- The abbreviation of a state's name alone indicates the highest appellate court in that state's judiciary at the time.
  - e.g.,"Pa." = Supreme Court of Pennsylvania
  - e.g.,"Me." = Supreme Judicial Court of Maine

== List of cases in 27 U.S. (2 Pet.) ==
Case Name	Page and year	Opinion of the Court	Concurring opinion(s)	Dissenting opinion(s)	Lower Court	Disposition
Pennock v. Dialogue	1 (1829)	Story	none	none	C.C.D. Pa.	affirmed
Columbian Insurance Company v. Lawrence	25 (1829)	Marshall	none	none	C.C.D.C.	reversed
Gardner v. Collins	58 (1829)	Story	none	none	C.C.D.R.I.	certification
Williams v. Second Bank of the United States	96 (1829)	Washington	none	none	C.C.D. Ohio	affirmed
Venable v. Second Bank of the United States	107 (1829)	Story	none	none	C.C.D. Ky.	affirmed
Second Bank of the United States v. Corcoran	121 (1829)	Washington	none	none	C.C.D.C.	affirmed
Jackson v. Twentyman	136 (1829)	per curiam	none	none	C.C.S.D.N.Y.	dismissed
Van Ness v. Pacard	137 (1829)	Story	none	none	C.C.D.C.	affirmed
Boyce v. Anderson	150 (1829)	Marshall	none	none	C.C.D. Ky.	affirmed
Thompson v. Tolmie	157 (1829)	Thompson	none	none	C.C.D.C.	reversed
Townsley v. Sumrall	170 (1829)	Story	none	none	C.C.D. Ky.	affirmed
Le Roy Bayard Company v. Johnson	186 (1829)	Washington	none	none	C.C.D.C.	affirmed
Hunt v. Wickliffe	201 (1829)	Marshall	none	none	C.C.D. Ky.	reversed
Patterson v. Jenks	216 (1829)	Marshall	none	none	C.C.D. Ga.	reversed
Harper v. Butler	239 (1829)	Marshall	none	none	D. Miss.	reversed
Powell's Lessee v. Harman	241 (1829)	Marshall	none	none	C.C.D.W. Tenn.	certification
Ritchie v. Mauro	243 (1829)	Marshall	none	none	C.C.D.C.	dismissed
Willson v. Black-Bird Creek Marsh Company	245 (1829)	Marshall	none	none	Del.	affirmed
Foster v. Neilson	253 (1829)	Marshall	none	none	D. La.	affirmed
Bank of Kentucky v. Wister	318 (1829)	Johnson	none	none	C.C.D. Ky.	affirmed
Bank of Kentucky v. Ashley	327 (1829)	Johnson	none	none	C.C.D. Ky.	affirmed
Second Bank of the United States v. Weisiger	331 (1829)	Johnson	none	none	C.C.D. Ky.	reversed
Campbell's Executors v. Francis	354 (1829)	Johnson	none	none	C.C.D.C.	affirmed
American Fur Company v. United States	358 (1829)	Washington	none	none	D. Ind.	reversed
Dandridge v. Washington's Executors	370 (1829)	Marshall	none	none	C.C.D.C.	reversed
Satterlee v. Matthewson	380 (1829)	Washington	Johnson	none	Pa.	affirmed
Reynolds v. McArthur	417 (1829)	Marshall	none	none	Ohio	affirmed
Southwick v. Postmaster General	442 (1829)	Marshall	none	none	C.C.S.D.N.Y.	dismissed
Weston v. City of Charleston	449 (1829)	Marshall	none	Johnson, Thompson	S.C. Const. Ct.	reversed
Second Bank of the United States v. Weisiger	481 (1829)	per curiam	none	none	C.C.D. Ky.	decree entered
Mandeville v. Riggs	482 (1829)	Story	none	none	C.C.D.C.	reversed
Bank of Hamilton v. Dudley's Lessee	492 (1829)	Marshall	none	none	Ohio	affirmed
Second Bank of the United States v. Owens	527 (1829)	Johnson	none	none	C.C.D. Ky.	certification
Second Bank of the United States v. Carneal	543 (1829)	Story	none	none	C.C.D. Ohio	reversed
Canter v. American Ocean Insurance Company	554 (1829)	Marshall	none	none	not indicated	motion overruled
Conolly v. Taylor	556 (1829)	Marshall	none	none	C.C.D. Ky.	affirmed
Beatty v. Kurtz	566 (1829)	Story	none	none	C.C.D.C.	affirmed
Buckner v. Finley	586 (1829)	Washington	none	none	C.C.D. Md.	certification
Smith v. Foxall	595 (1829)	Thompson	none	none	C.C.D.C.	multiple
Chirac v. Reinecker	613 (1829)	Story	none	none	C.C.D. Md.	reversed
Wilkinson v. Leland	627 (1829)	Story	none	none	C.C.D.R.I.	reversed
Le Grand v. Darnall	664 (1829)	Duvall	none	none	C.C.D. Md.	affirmed
Bank of Columbia v. Sweeny	671 (1829)	Marshall	none	none	C.C.D.C.	affirmed
Beach v. Viles	675 (1829)	Story	none	none	C.C.D. Mass.	affirmed

== See also ==
- certificate of division
