= Pennock (surname) =

Pennock is a surname. Notable people with the surname include:

- Abraham L. Pennock (1786–1868), American abolitionist and inventor
- Adrian Pennock (born 1971), English football manager
- Alexander Mosely Pennock (1813–1876), officer of the United States Navy
- Christopher Pennock (1944–2021), American actor
- Ellen Pennock (born 1988), Canadian triathlete
- Herb Pennock (1894–1948), American baseball player
- Joni Pennock, American talk show host
- Lon Pennock (1945–2020), Dutch artist
- Robert Pennock (1936–2019), Canadian politician
- Robert T. Pennock, American philosopher
- Stan Pennock (1892–1916), American football player
- Tony Pennock (born 1971), Welsh goalkeeper and coach
- Raymond Pennock, Baron Pennock (1920–1993), British industrialist
