= Joseph Zentmayer =

German-American maker of optical instruments

Joseph Zentmayer (March 27, 1826 — March 28, 1888) was a German-American maker of microscopes and other optical instruments.

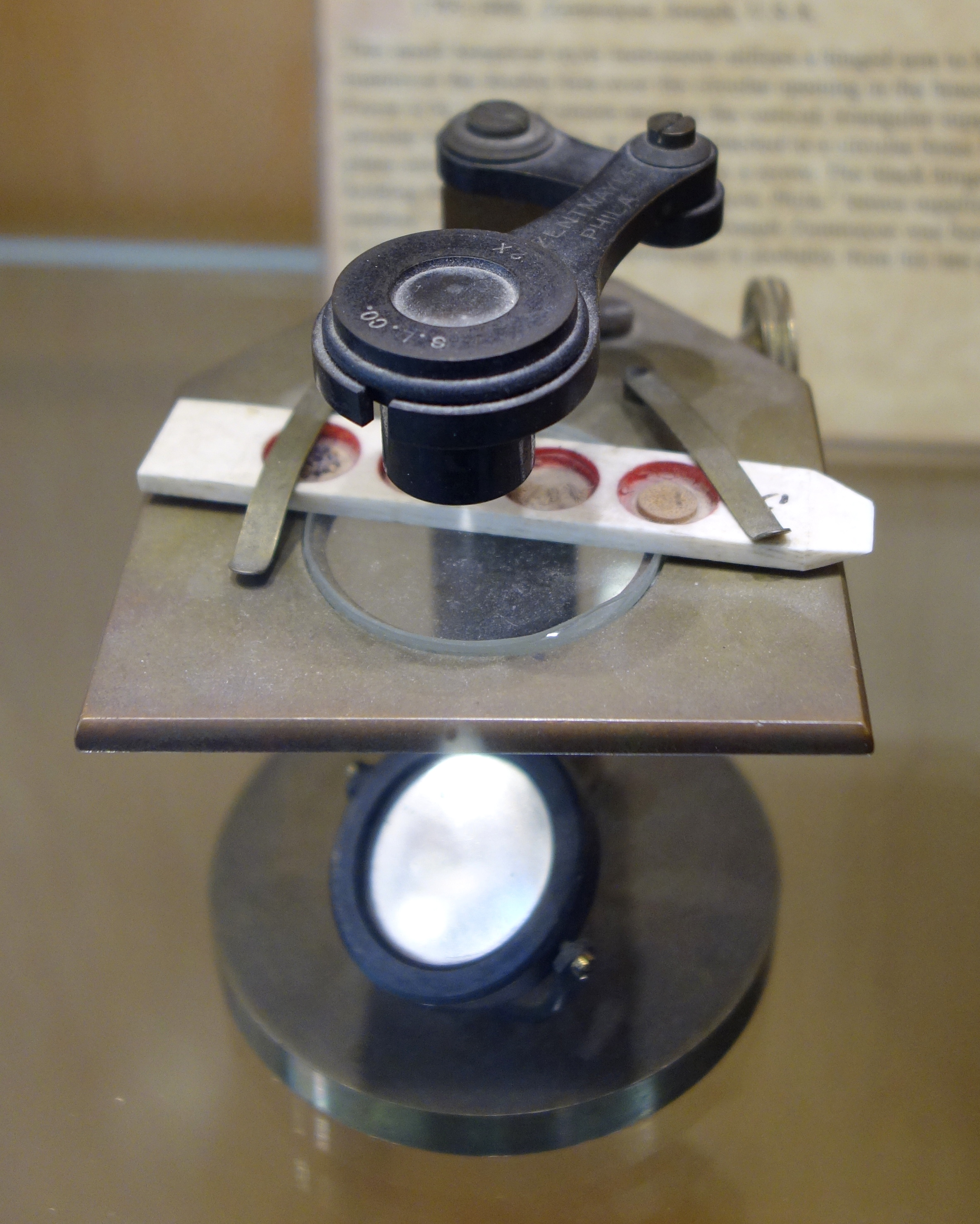
Simple dissecting microscope created by Joseph Zentmayer on display at the Golub Collection of Antique Microscopes, University of California Berkeley

After graduating from the gymnasium in Mannheim, he was apprenticed to a local optician. After completing his apprenticeship, he associated himself with optical establishments in Karlsruhe, Frankfort, Munich, and Hamburg. Because of his pro-democracy support of the 1848 Revolution, he immigrated to the United States when he was about twenty-two years old. After working for wages in optical workshops in Baltimore and Philadelphia, Zentmayer started in 1858 his own shop in Philadelphia at the corner of Eighth Street and Chestnut Street. During the American Civil War, he provided most of the microscopes used in the U.S. government hospitals. He was appointed a member of the Iowa Total Eclipse Expedition in 1869 and contributed to the success of the expedition by his work on the photographic apparatus.

For sheer magnificence and quality of workmanship, few microscopes made in the United States can rival the instruments made by Joseph Zentmayer of Philadelphia in the last half of the 19th century. Zentmayer's crowning achievement was the glorious Centennial Model, made in April 1876, so named because it was exhibited at the Centennial in Fairmount Park. The Centennial Commission awarded Zentmayer a medal for the high quality of his workmanship and for the several innovations incorporated in his new microscope. These innovations, later copied by most of the better microscope makers in this country and abroad, included a smooth-working glass microslide holder and object stage, and a swinging substage mechanism for oblique illumination.

The Centennial Model is on display at the Delaware County Institute of Science in Media, Pennsylvania.

He was elected as a member to the American Philosophical Society in 1873. In 1875 Zentmayer was awarded the Elliott Cresson Medal of the Franklin Institute. In 1876 in Philadelphia, the United States Centennial Commission awarded him a bronze medal. In 1878 the Committee of Awards on Microscopes of the Paris Exhibition awarded him a silver medal and a diploma.
