= Alessandro Lustig =

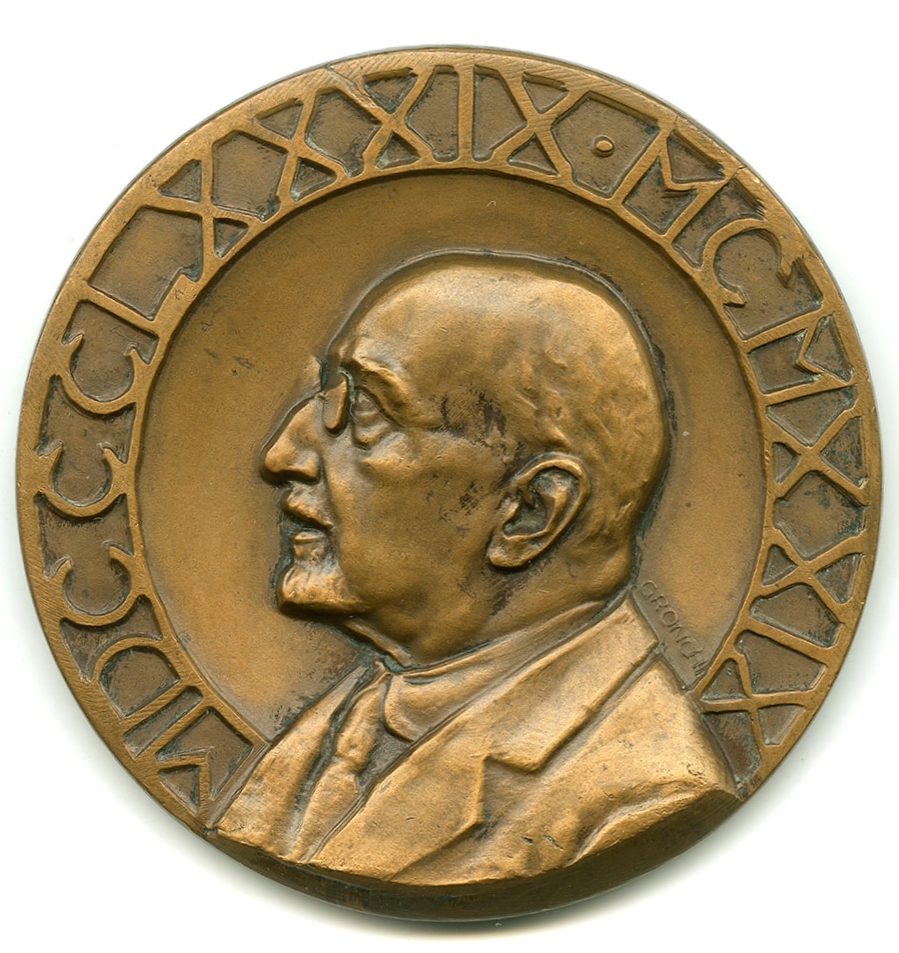
Profile of Lustig in a commemorative medal by Giuseppe Gronchi

Alessandro Lustig or Alessandro Lustig Piacezzi (5 May 1857 – 23 September 1937) was an Austrian-Italian pathologist who worked on a number of infectious diseases and their management. He developed approaches to boost immunity against plague, worked on approaches in the management of malaria and established the Institute of General Experimental Pathology and Bacteriology at the Royal University of Florence in 1923. He served as a senator from 1911, holding important positions in several universities.

== Early life and education ==
Lustig was born in Trieste, then a part of the Austrian empire, to the Jewish family of Maurizio and Regina (Anna) Segrè and after receiving education locally, he joined the University of Vienna to study medicine. He studied physiology under Ernst Wilhelm von Brücke and after receiving his degree in 1883 worked at Innsbruck. He moved to Turin and obtained a medical degree, studying under Giulio Bizzozero, after which he worked at the local Mauriziano hospital and established a laboratory there. Here he examined cholera during an outbreak in 1886.

== Career ==
He became a professor of pathology at the University of Cagliari in 1889, moving to Florence the next year working chiefly on infectious diseases, bacteriology, and immunology. Along with his students Gino Galeotti and Giovanni Polverini, he worked on the induction of an immune response to the toxins obtained from plague bacilli around 1897. This led to a visit to Bombay as part of a British-Italian team to examine cures for the plague. They extracted serum by injecting and immunizing horses. The resulting prophylactic effects against the plague were examined in trials conducted by Nasarwanji Hormusji Choksy.

Lustig's early work was on histology and physiology of nerves and muscles. He also made studies on the embryological development of olfactory epithelium, the etiology of goitre and acetonuria. During World War I, he served as a field doctor, working on measures against cholera and typhus. He later studied mainly infectious diseases and was involved in a number of public health committees. He travelled to Turkey, Argentina, Brazil and several other places.

Lustig became an Italian citizen in 1891. He married Linda Piacezzi in 1915 and changed his surname. He retired in 1932 and died at Marina di Pietrasanta, Lucca. He received several honours including the Grand Cross of the Order of the Crown of Italy (1924) and Grand Cordon of the Order of SS. Maurizio and Lazzaro (1933).
