= Abraham L. Pennock =

American abolitionist and inventor (1786–1868)

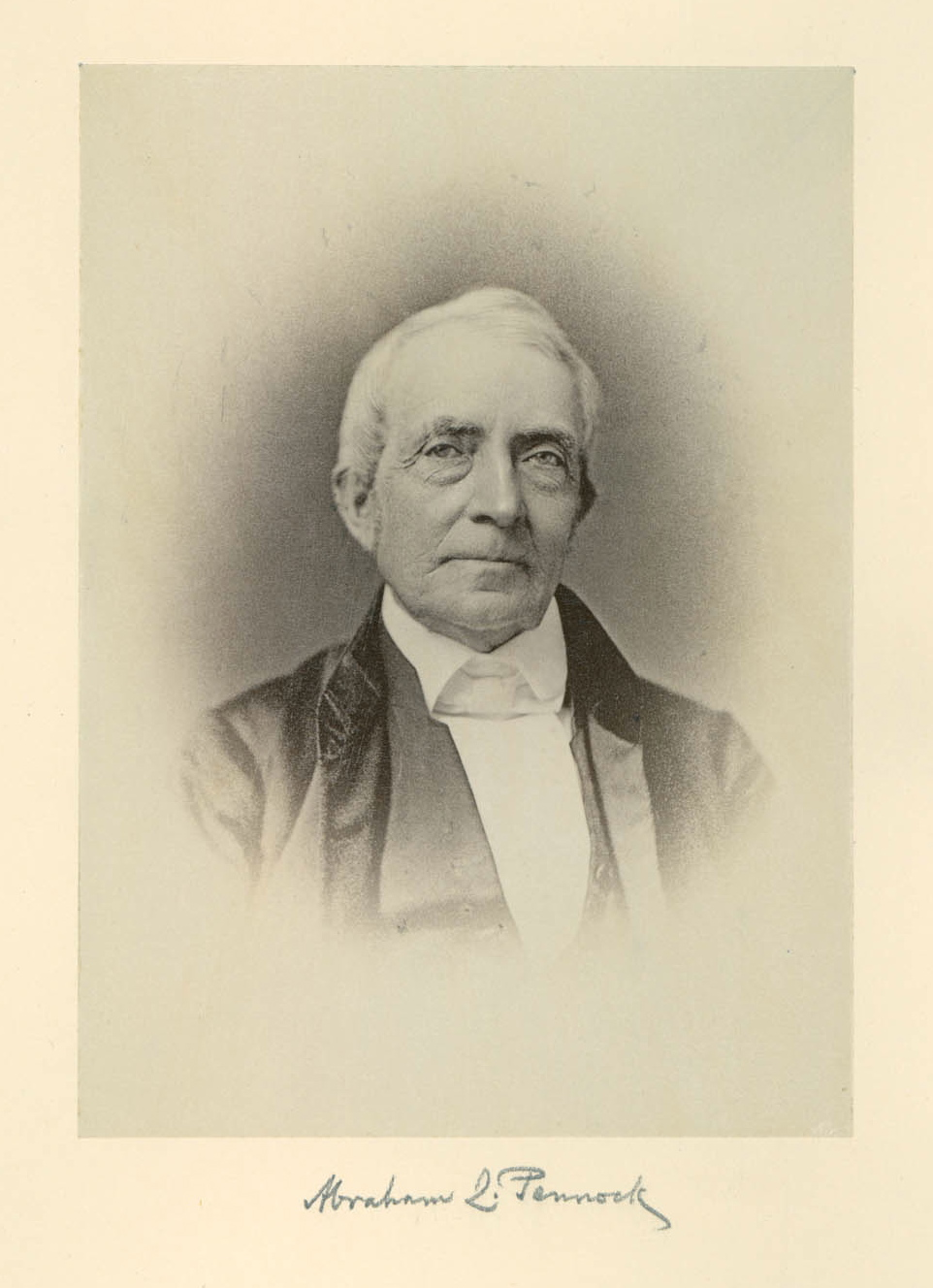
- Born: Abraham Liddon Pennock; August 7, 1786; Philadelphia, Pennsylvania, US
- Died: May 12, 1868 (aged 81); Upper Darby Township, Pennsylvania
- Occupations: Abolitionist, inventor
- Organization: American Anti-Slavery Society

Abraham Liddon Pennock (August 7, 1786 – May 12, 1868) was an American abolitionist, inventor, and businessman who was a prominent voice in the free produce movement and served as vice president of the Pennsylvania Anti-Slavery Society. A Pennsylvania state historical marker was dedicated in Pennock's honor in Upper Darby Township on October 24, 1985.

== Life and business ==
Pennock was born in Philadelphia on August 7, 1786, to George and Mary Liddon Pennock. He inherited a gristmill and other wealth from family members and participated in various business enterprises, investing in dry goods and co-owning the Philadelphia Hose Company, which manufactured riveted leather hose. Invented by Pennock and James Sellers and first used at Pennock's mill, this hose remained in widespread use until the development of rubber hose. The company also constructed fire engines. Such was the strength of the hose that the US government hired the firm to manufacture all mail bags used in its service. In 1840, he retired from business and moved to Haverford Township and then to Upper Darby Township in 1845.

In 1829, Pennock was the lead plaintiff in Pennock v. Dialogue, in which the Supreme Court of the United States voided his patent on a method of making riveted leather hose and dismissed an infringement claim filed by Pennock and his co-inventor and business partner James Sellers, who had invented the hose in 1811 but filed for a patent belatedly in 1818.

== Social activism ==
Pennock was a devout Quaker who supported women's suffrage and temperance as well as the abolition of slavery. He was active in the Underground Railroad and was a founding member of the Free Produce Association, a network of businesses that sold cotton and other products untainted by enslaved labor beginning in 1827. He voted in elections for the Free Soil Party and Republican Party, breaking from fellow Quakers who opposed slavery with "moral persuasion" rather than the ballot box. Pennock co-founded the Non-Slaveholder, the only periodical devoted to the free produce cause, and co-edited the paper from 1846 through 1847 (lack of subscribers caused the paper to fold in 1850). Friends and frequent visitors to his home included George Thompson, James Russell Lowell, Theodore Dwight Weld, and John Greenleaf Whittier.

Pennock resigned as vice president of the Pennsylvania chapter of the American Anti-Slavery Society in 1841. The society had dispatched a delegation of both men and women to an international convention hosted by the British and Foreign Anti-Slavery Society, which admitted male delegates only. When the British society rejected the American society's female delegates, the Americans passed a resolution declaring the British behavior "arbitrary and despotic." Pennock rejected this heated rhetoric and resigned. He believed that the movement needed to focus its efforts on abolitionism and not complicate its efforts with controversies around women's equality.

Pennock served as secretary (equivalent to president) of the board of managers of Haverford College, a private liberal arts college with Quaker origins just outside Philadelphia, from May 14, 1835, to May 8, 1837. He served as a member of the board of managers from 1830 to 1841 and again from 1844 to 1852.

== Personal life ==
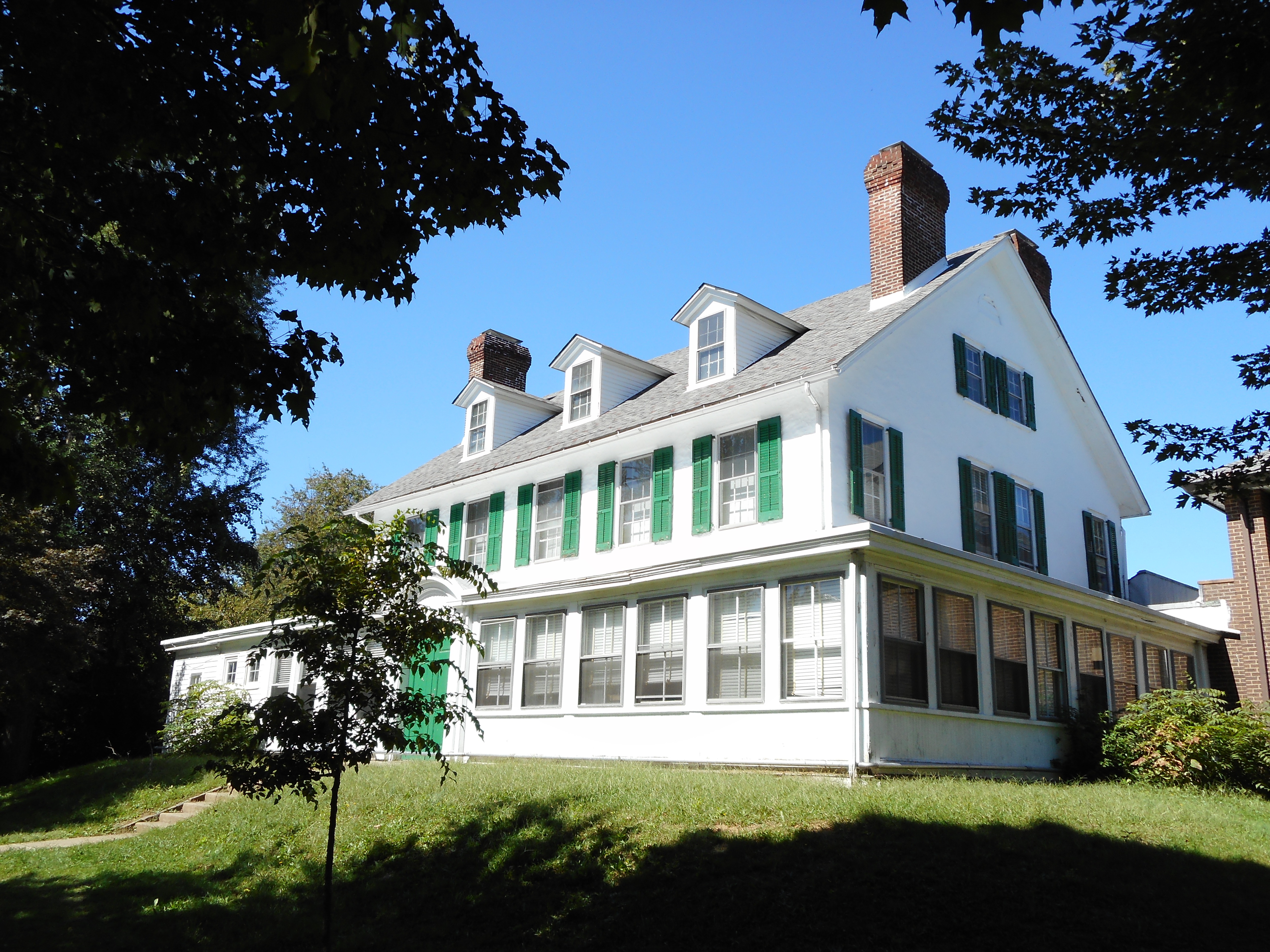
Abraham L. Pennock House (2017)

In his later years, Pennock lived at Hoodland Farm, a large house and property built in 1823 and willed to Pennock's wife, Elizabeth, by his father-in-law, John Sellers II. The farmhouse is located in Upper Darby Township, Pennsylvania.

Pennock married Elizabeth Sellers on June 7, 1810. The couple had nine named children: George, Mary C. John S., Joseph L., Sarah, Ann, Casper, Abraham L., and Isabella. Abraham Pennock died at Hoodland in Upper Darby on May 12, 1868. Elizabeth Pennock, who had been born in Philadelphia on August 26, 1791, died two years later at Hoodland on June 17, 1870.

A Pennsylvania state historical marker was dedicated in Pennock's honor at Hoodland on October 24, 1985.

== See also ==
- List of Pennsylvania state historical markers in Delaware County
