= George Smith (Pennsylvania politician, born 1804) =

American politician (1804–1882)

George C. Smith (February 12, 1804 – March 10, 1882) was a politician, historian, scientist, and medical doctor from Delaware County, Pennsylvania.

== Early life ==
George C. Smith was born on February 12, 1804, in Haverford Township, Pennsylvania, to Benjamin Hayes Smith and Margaret Dunn Smith. He graduated with an MD from the University of Pennsylvania in 1826. He was married to Mary Lewis in 1829 by future Vice President George M. Dallas.

== Career ==
Smith was elected to the Pennsylvania State Senate for the 4th district in 1831, serving from 1832 to 1836 as a member of the Anti-Masonic Party. During his time in office, he became chairman of the Senate Committee on Education, and drafted a law which provided for free public education in Pennsylvania. Because of this, he was appointed the first Superintendent of Common Schools of Delaware County and President of the School Board of Upper Darby School District. In 1836, he was appointed by Governor Joseph Ritner as Associate Judge of the Court of Common Pleas of Delaware County. He was one of the founders of the Delaware County Institute of Science, and served as its first president. In 1862, Smith published History of Delaware County, Pennsylvania.

== Death ==
Smith died on March 10, 1882 in Upper Darby, Pennsylvania. He is interred at the Old Haverford Friends Meeting Burial Ground.
