= Lucien Bull =

Irish-French chronophotographer

Lucien Bull (January 5, 1876 – August 25, 1972) was a pioneer in chronophotography. Chronophotography is defined as "a set of photographs of a moving object, taken for the purpose of recording and exhibiting successive phases of motion."

== Early life ==
Born in Dublin, Ireland, to British father, Cornelius Bull, and French mother, Gabrielle Joune, Bull lived his younger years in Dublin where he attended school and lived at home with his parents. Later in 1894, Bull moved to France to visit his aunts. After several months, Bull eventually settled in the area and became an assistant to Étienne-Jules Marey in 1895. Marey was a physiologist interested in capturing human movement for later study. At the time, Marey was working on the cinematographic, which was a camera that was shaped like a rifle and took pictures of moving objects from a rotating plate. This eventually became known as the “gun camera”, a predecessor to the movie picture camera, which Bull later devised a faster moving version.

This camera was designed to investigate the study of motion. Basically, this “gun camera” was designed to take an object in motion and snap still shots. By taking these still shots, each movement made by the object was captured and then studied to analyze movement patterns that were unable to be studied before. The first successful film was taken in 1904 when Bull was able to film the flight of a fly at 1,200 frames per second. Bull also created a “spark drum Camera” that replicated the continuous motion of 35-mm film. Using an electromagnetic shutter, two side-by-side films were exposed and wound around drums inside the camera built from wooden frames.

== Successes ==
Marey died in May 1904. As a result of his death, Bull became head of the Marey Institute, which formed part of the Collège de France. While remaining with the Marey Institute, Bull was naturalized as a French citizen in 1931. After a few years, Bull eventually introduced a few papers on a wide variety of subjects ranging from spark illuminations, high-speed motion-picture photography, original studies of insect and bird flight, and electrocardiography and muscle and heart functions. His work was eventually listed by Dr. W. Hinsch in Research Film for December 1953.

== Roles ==
Bull began his career as an assistant to Etienne Jules Marey in 1895. His roles would include developing and printing the chronophographic negatives. After Marey's death in 1904, Bull became the Director of l'Institut in Paris. In 1933, he was put in charge of research at the National Office of Research and Invention in France. When the First World War broke out, Lucian joined the war effort developing systems for the high-speed photographic analyses of ballistics and for locating enemy gun batteries via a sound ranging device. These were highly effective and enhanced his already significant reputation, and governmental appointments followed. Honours included the CBE (1920), and the legion of honour (1954). He was awarded gold medals for his roles in developing the field of chronophotography by the National Office of Research and Invention (1933).

== Later life and death ==
In 1948 Bull became the president of the Institution of Scientific Cinematography in Paris. His work was eventually listed by Dr. W. Hinsch in Research Film for December 1953.

He continued his research well in to the 1950s, still publishing papers on high-speed cinematography and had a profound influence on many branches of engineering and science. Although Bull was from Ireland, he settled in France which is where he spent the majority of his later life. However, he did visit Ireland several times throughout this period. As Bull never married, he had many friends who admired him and was still receiving visitors to tea in his Paris flat in 1971. Described by a close friend Bull was this ‘tiny, bird-like, lovable figure, with an irrepressible sense of humour, and an ability to bring pleasure to those around him’.

Bull received several honours for his significant work. Among the honours he received were the Legion of honours, the Order of Merit, an Academy of Sciences Laureate, several gold medals for scientific research from French institutions and an OBE from the British Government.

Lucien Bull died in his Paris flat at the age of 95 on 25 August 1972.

=== Honors and Distinctions ===
- Officer of the Legion of Honor (1954)
- Commander of the Order of the British Empire (1920)
- Commander of the National Order of Mwit (1966)
- Laureate of the French Academy of Sciences (Prix Leconte, 1955)
- Gold Medal of the National Office of Research and Invention (1933)
- Gold Medal of the Palace of Discovery (1937)
- Gold Medal of the Society for the Encouragement of the National Industry (1947)
- Director of the Marey Institute
- Honorary Fellow of the Royal Photographic Society (1955)
- President of the Institute de Cinematographie Scientifique (1957)
- Director of the Ecole des Hautes Etudes (1937)
- Director in Research at the Centre National de la Recherche Scientifique (1947)

=== Bibliography of Papers ===
- December 1953- W. Hinsch: Research Film (biannual review)
- No. 9 pp. 26–29 Göttingen
- Feb. 29, 1904 - Motional mechanism of the insect wing, Comptes Rendus de I’Acadbmie des Sciences v. 138pp. 590–592
- Mar. 21, 1904 - Application of the electric spark to the chronophotography of rapid motions, Comptes Rendus v. 138 pp. 155–157
- .June 11, 1904 - Chronophotography of rapid motions, Bulletin de la Sociktk Philomathiclue, Paris
- Nov. 12, 1904 - Synthesis in chronophotography, Bulletin de la SociktC I’hhilomathiyue, Paris
- Nov. 22, 1909 - Researches on the flight of the insect, Comptes Rendus v. 149pp. 942–944
- June 10, 1910 - Inclinations of the wing surface of the insect dur- ing flight, Comptes Rendus v. 150pp. 129–131
- 1910 - On the motion of recording cylinders, ’I’rauauxde l’lnstitut Marey v. 2
- 1910- Chronophotography of rapid motions, Trauaux de l’lmtitut Marey v. 2
- 1911 - On simultaneous recordings on the phono- and electro- cardiogram, Quarterly Journal of Experimental Physiology
- May 6, 1912 On an optical illusion perceived at the moment of eye blinking, Comptes Rendus v. 154 pp. 1261–1253
- May 1913 - Microscopic chronophotography, Journal de Physio-et Pathologie génerale.
- 1913 - Synthesis of heart sounds by means of the wave siren, Demonstration to the Physiology Congress at Vienna
- 1914 - with Clerc and I’ezzi: electrocardiographic researches on the action of nicotine, Comptes Rendus (Soc. Biological) p. 82
- 1914 - with Clerc and Pezzi: Disturbances to the cardiac rhythm provoked by strontium chloride, Comptes Rendus (Soc. Bio- logical) p. 82
- 1915 - Method of location of (gun) batteries by sound ranging. Note submitted to the Soci6tB GCographique de l’ArmBe, Paris, and to the Sound Ranging Section, War Office, London (not printed)
- Nov. 1919 - Application of chronophotography by electrical sparks to the study of ballistic phenomena, Official Bulletin of the Direction des Hecherches et Inventions, No. 1.48
- Apr. 18, 1922 - Apparatus for the rapid dissociation of images in cinematography with electric sparks, Comptes Rendus, v. 174 pp. 1059–1061
- July 17, 1922-J.Athanasius and L. Bull: Recording of the longi- tudinal vibrations of muscles during voluntary contraction, Comptes Rendus v. 175 pp. 181–183
- June 4, 1923 - Photographic technique for bringing out weak de- formations in rectilinear objects, Comptes Hendus v. 176 pp. 1612–1613
- 1924 - Recent developments in high-speed cinematography. Lec- ture at Royal Society, London
- 1923- Cinematography (1 vol.) Armand Colins eries, No. 94, Paris
- Feb. 26, 1931 - The welding arc in slow motion, Bulktin of the Society of Welding Engineers in France
- Feb. 2, 1931 - S. Veil and L. Bull: Microscopic and cinematographic study of Iiesegang rings, Comptes Rendus v. 192, pp. 282–284
- Mar. 16, 1931 - with S. Veil: Kinetic study of Liesegang rings, Comptes Rendus v. 192pp. 682–683
- 1931 - with S. Veil: Optical study of the secondary Liesegangrings, Comptes Rendus v. 192 pp. 1314–1315
- 1933 - Apparatus for the cinematographic analysis of rapid motions. Report of the 7th Reunion of the Association des Physiologistes, Liege
- 1934 - On the photographic exposure effectiveness of the electric spark, Revue d’optique théorique et instrumentale v. 13 pp. 9–16
- 1934 - Cinematography using sparks, Revue d’optique théorique et instrumentale. 13pp. 13–22
- 1934 - An optical assemblage for photographic recorders. Report to the Centre Nationale de la Recherche Scientifique (not printed)
- 1934 - IJse of the string galvanometer as electrometer. Report to the Centre Nationale de la Recherche Scientifique (not print- ed)
- 1935 - Photographic recording of the circulation speed of small animals. Report to the Centre Nationale de la Recherche Scientifique (not printed)
- 1935 - A string galvanometer using a liquid jet, Comptes Rendus V. 2 0 0 ~1~18.4-1185
- 1935 - Optical recording of the second. Report to the Centre Nationale de la Recherche Scientifique (not printed)
- 1936 - with P. Girard: New cinematographic device for recording very rapid phenomena, Comptes Rendus v. 202 pp. 554–555
- 1936 - Recording of (animal) pulse frequency. Report to the Centre Nationale de la Recherche Scientifique
- Nov. 8, 1937 - with P. Girard: Influence of electric and magnetic fields on the electric spark, Comptes Rendus v. 205 pp. 846–847
- April 12, 1938 - The liquid jet string galvanometer, Jl. de Physio et Pathologie GI.nI.rales
- 1942 - On the obtaining of electric currents of short and well-de-fined duration. Report to the Centre Nationale de la Recherche Scientifique (not printed)
- 1946 - Apparatus for the measurement of the accommodation time of the eye. Report to the Centre Nationale de la Recherche Scientifique (not printed)
- 1946 - The determination of the minimum number of sound vi-
- 1947 - Contribution to the photographic technique of the shock wave C‘omptesRendus v. 225 pp. 405–406
- 1948- The measurement of very short time intervals between two sparks C’omptes Rendus v. 226 pp. 1353–1354
- 1950 - The cinematographic analysis of rapid motions (1,000,000 images/sec.) Mesure v. 15pp.329 333
- 1952- Optical device for the reception of cinematographic images at high frequency, Comptes Hmdua v. 235 pp. 1210–1211
- Nov. 1952 - Optical device for the reception of cinematic images at high frequency, Krs FilmNo.1, p. I1

== Legacy ==
Bull died in Paris in 1972 as a bachelor, leaving behind no children. He outlived his brother, British cartoonist René Bull, by almost 30 years. Bull's work spanned fields beyond high speed photography, with his bibliography of published papers ranging from military applications of sound in the form of sound ranging and medical papers to recording of video. Much of this was continued research from his work with Étienne-Jules Marey. Bull's work as an assistant with Marey, particularly in regards to developing Marey's camera gun into the higher speed spark-drum camera, was instrumental in the development of the technique of chronophotography, and was key to his appointment as head of the Marey Institute. Chronophotography itself acted as a stepping stone to the development of cinematography and silent film. The lasting effects of the technique are observable to this day, as it provided a foundation for modern cinema. Some of Bull's work has been preserved to this day. A copy of his stereoscopic spark drum camera is held in the National Science and Media Museum of Bradford, England.

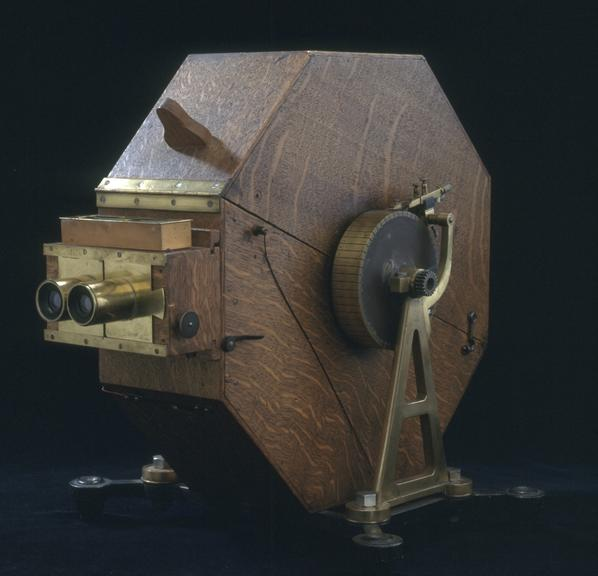
Lucien Bull's stereoscopic spark drum camera.

His research on the heart was later used in the development of the electro-cardiograph. Bull was memorialized in an article for the Irish Engineer's Journal, written by Kenneth Mitchell and published on 17 April 2018, giving an overview of Bull's life and accomplishments.
