= Robert Lustig =

Endocrinologist, professor

Robert H. Lustig
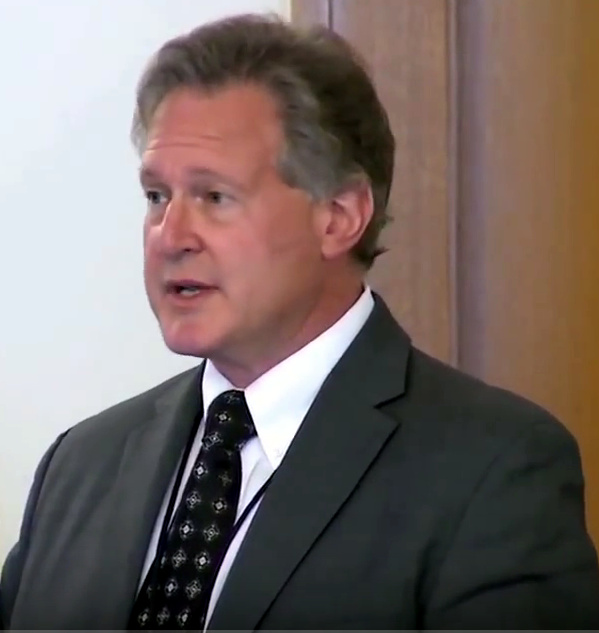
- Lustig in 2013
- Born: 1957 (age 68–69); New York City, US
- Education: Massachusetts Institute of Technology (BS); Cornell University (MD); University of California, Hastings College of the Law (MSL)
- Medical career
- Profession: Clinical medical practice, teaching and research
- Field: Neuroendocrinology, pediatric endocrinology
- Institutions: University of California, San Francisco
- Sub-specialties: Childhood obesity, metabolic syndrome
- Research: Biochemical, neural, hormonal and genetic influences contributing to obesity
- Website: profiles.ucsf.edu/robert.lustig

Robert H. Lustig (born 1957) is an American pediatric endocrinologist. He is professor emeritus of pediatrics in the division of endocrinology at the University of California, San Francisco (UCSF), where he specialized in neuroendocrinology and childhood obesity. He is also director of UCSF's WATCH program (Weight Assessment for Teen and Child Health), and president and co-founder of the non-profit Institute for Responsible Nutrition.

Lustig came to public attention in 2009 when one of his medical lectures, "Sugar: The Bitter Truth", was aired. He is the editor of Obesity Before Birth: Maternal and Prenatal Influences on the Offspring (2010), and author of Fat Chance: Beating the Odds against Sugar, Processed Food, Obesity, and Disease (2013).

== Biography ==
Lustig grew up in Brooklyn, New York, and attended Stuyvesant High School in Manhattan. He obtained a bachelor's degree from the Massachusetts Institute of Technology in 1976 and a M.D. from Cornell University Medical College in 1980.

His pediatric residency was completed at St. Louis Children's Hospital in 1983 and his clinical fellowship in pediatric endocrinology at UCSF the following year. After this he worked at Rockefeller University for six years as a post-doctoral fellow and research associate in neuroendocrinology. Before returning to UCSF in 2001, he was a faculty member at the University of Tennessee, Memphis, and the University of Wisconsin-Madison, and worked at St. Jude Children's Research Hospital in Memphis. In 2013 he completed a Master of Studies in Law (MSL) from UC Hastings College of the Law.

Lustig has authored 105 peer-reviewed articles and 65 reviews. He is a former chair of the obesity task force of the Pediatric Endocrine Society, a member of the obesity task force of the Endocrine Society, and sits on the steering committee of the International Endocrine Alliance to Combat Obesity. He is married with two daughters and lives in San Francisco.

== Publications ==
Lustig's publications discussed a proposed toxic effect of dietary fructose – a component of sucrose (table sugar), honey, fruit and some vegetables – on the development of obesity. In the early 21st century, Lustig believed that the liver is damaged by fructose in table sugar and high-fructose corn syrup used in manufactured food and beverages (particularly convenience food and soft drinks), and by fructose in fruit juice and vegetable juice. His position was that sugars are not simply empty calories, and rejected the idea that "a calorie is a calorie."

Lustig was a coauthor of the 2009 American Heart Association guideline on sugar intake, which recommended that women consume no more than 100 calories daily from added sugars and men no more than 150.

== Reception ==
Lustig's statements regarding fructose as a "poison" and the primary cause of weight gain have been disputed because claims of fructose toxicity are unproven. Excessive consumption of fructose-containing beverages is likely a cause of weight gain and obesity in many people due to the additional caloric intake rather than a specific toxic effect of fructose. Fructose – when consumed in excess as a sweetening agent in foods and beverages – is associated with surplus calories and greater risk of obesity, diabetes, and cardiovascular disorders as components of metabolic syndrome. Other reviews indicate that fructose has no specific adverse effects compared to any other carbohydrate.

== Selected works ==
Books

- (2010) Obesity Before Birth: Maternal and Prenatal Influences on the Offspring. Boston: Springer Science.
- (2013) Fat Chance: Beating the Odds against Sugar, Processed Food, Obesity, and Disease. New York: Hudson Street Press.
- (2013) Sugar Has 56 Names: A Shopper's Guide, Avery.
- (2014) with Heather Millar, The Fat Chance Cookbook, Thorndike Press.
- (2017) The Hacking of the American Mind, Avery. ISBN 978-1-101-98258-7
- (2021) Metabolical: The Lure and Lies of Processed Food, Nutrition, and Modern Medicine. New York: Harper Wave. ISBN 978-0-06-302771-8

Articles

- Weiss, R; Bremer, AA; Lustig, RH (2013). "What is metabolic syndrome, and why are children getting it?". Ann. N. Y. Acad. Sci. 1281 (1): 123–40. Bibcode:2013NYASA1281..123W. doi:10.1111/nyas.12030. PMC 3715098. PMID 23356701.

== See also ==
- Epidemiology of metabolic syndrome
- Epidemiology of obesity
- Fed Up (documentary featuring Lustig, 2014)
- Metabolic disorder
