= Graceanna Lewis =

American naturalist and illustrator

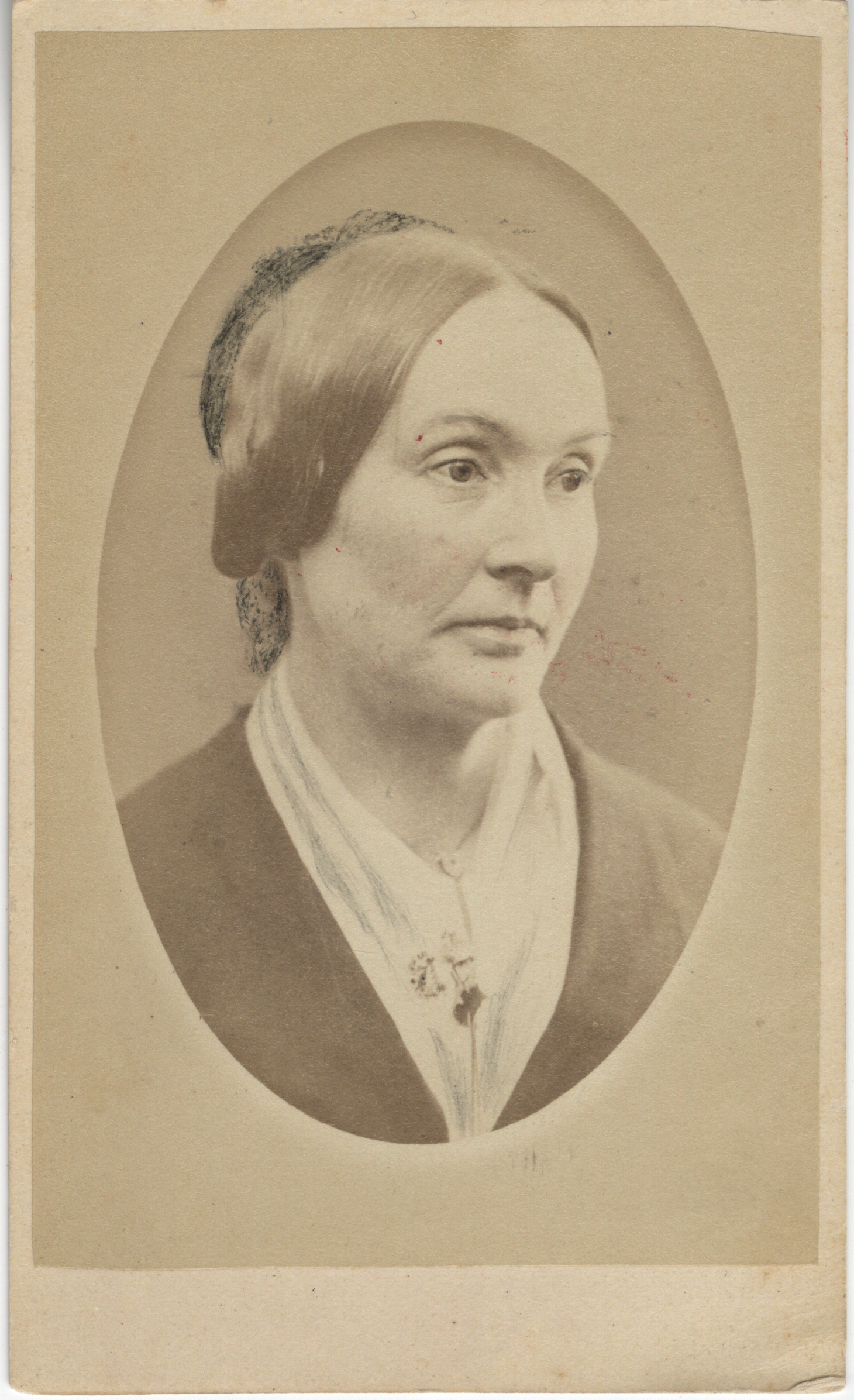
- Born: August 3, 1821
- Died: February 25, 1912 (aged 90)
- Occupations: school teacher, activist, naturalist, illustrator
- Parents: Esther Fussell Lewis; John Lewis

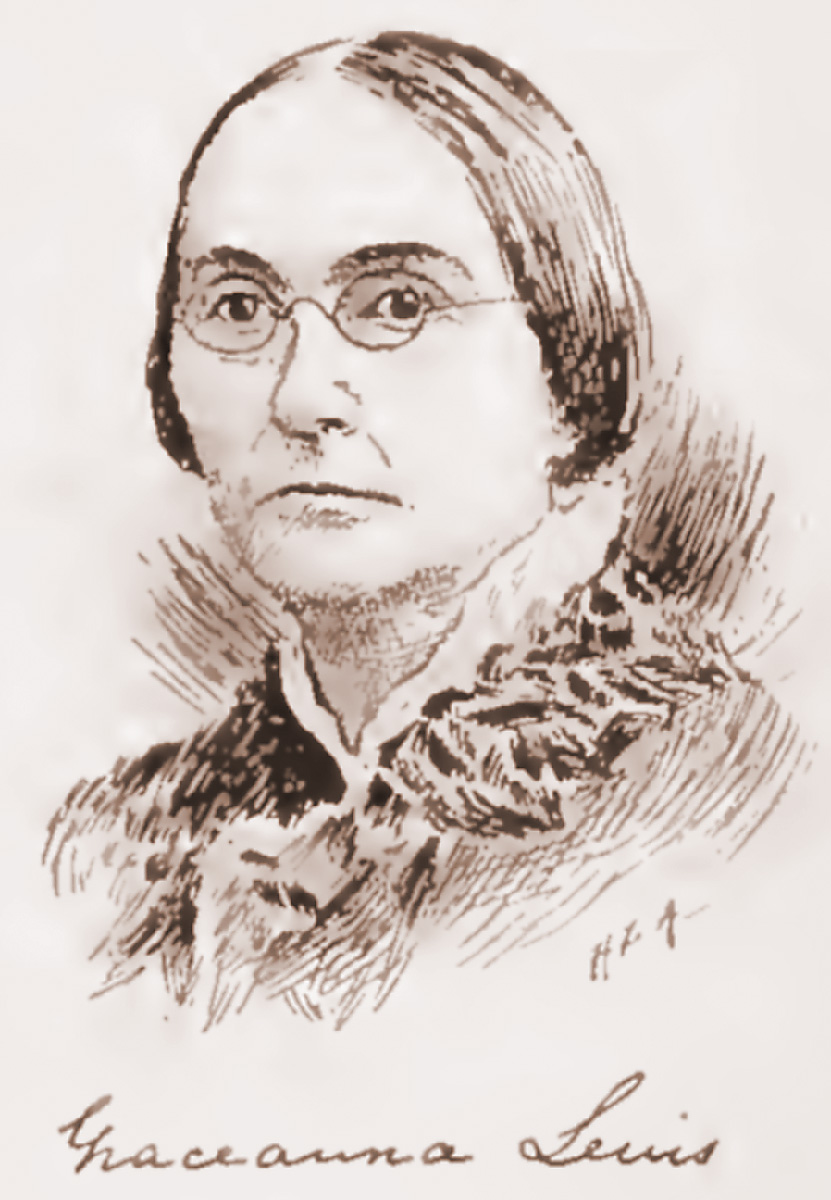
Illustration of Lewis from The National Cyclopaedia of American Biography in 1899

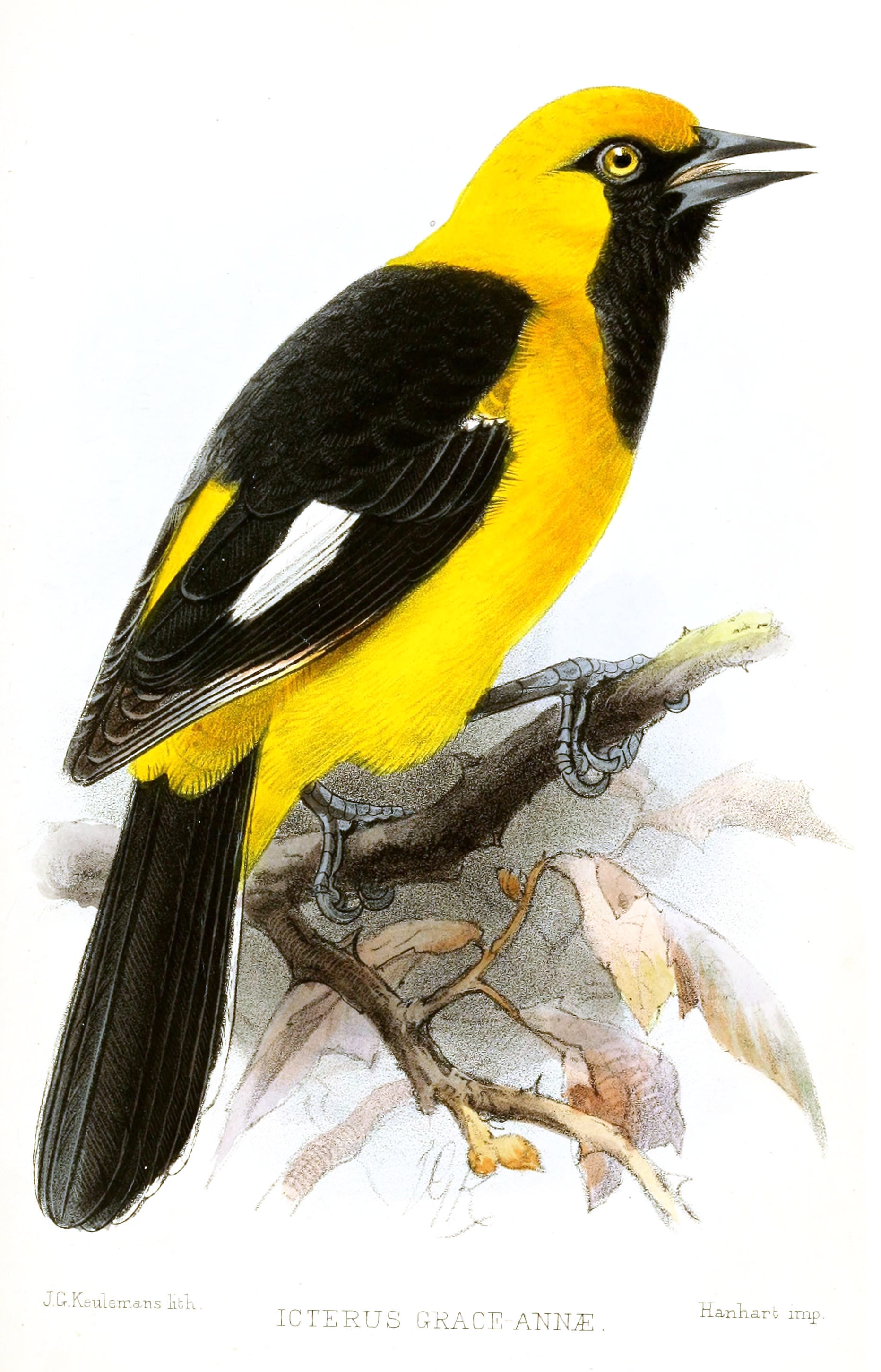
The white-edged oriole named Icterus graceannae in Graceanna's honor

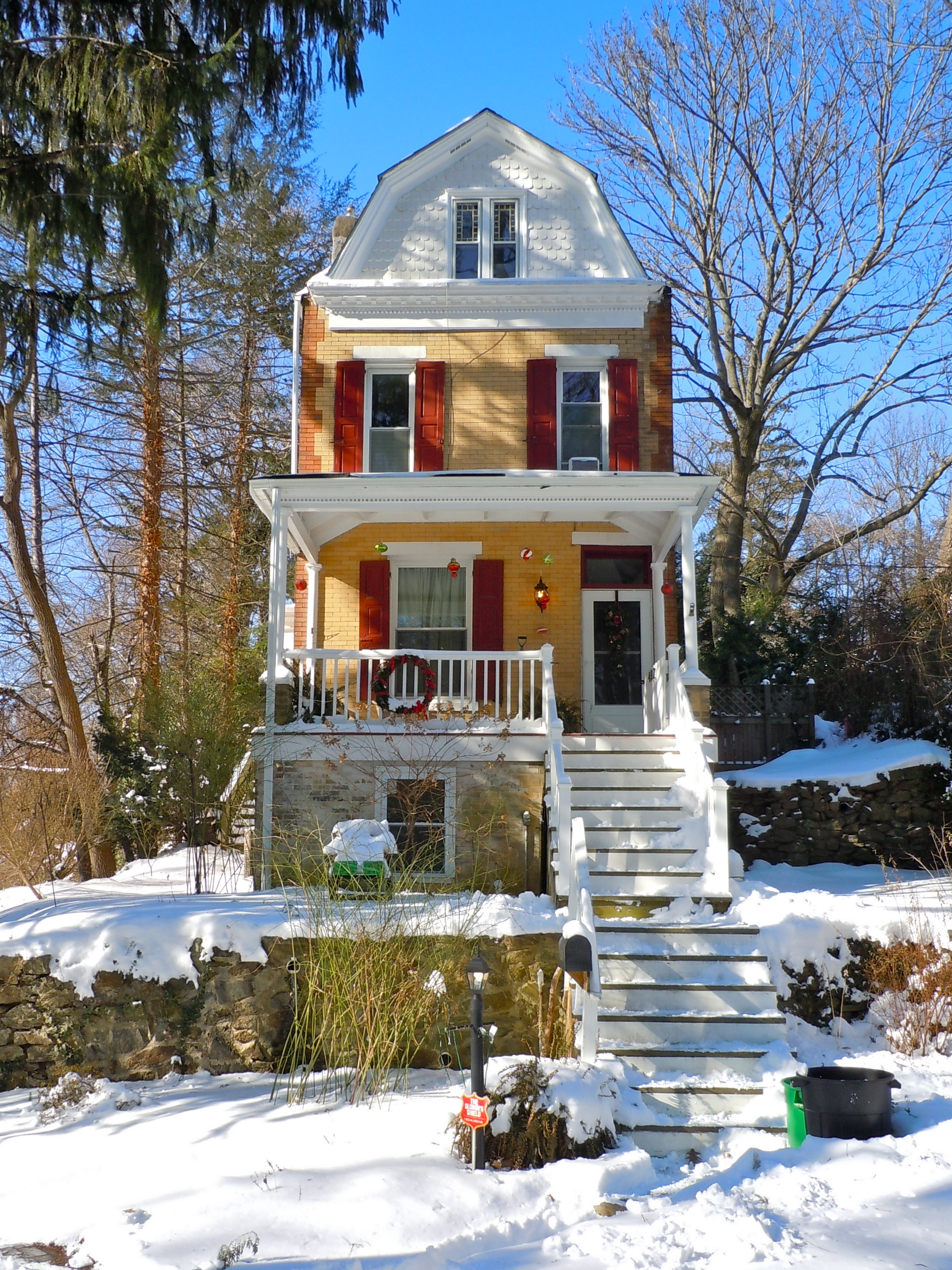
Lewis' home on Gayley Street in Media, Pennsylvania, in December 2010

Graceanna Lewis (August 3, 1821 – February 25, 1912) was an American naturalist, illustrator, and social reformer. An expert in the field of ornithology, Lewis is remembered as a pioneer female American scientist as well as an activist in the anti-slavery, temperance, and women's suffrage movements.

== Early years and education ==
Lewis was born on August 3, 1821, on a farm near West Vincent Township in Chester County, Pennsylvania. She was the second of four daughters of a Quaker farmer named John Lewis and his wife, the former Esther Fussell. Graceanna's ancestors included a friend of William Penn who had emigrated to the new Province of Pennsylvania from South Wales in 1682.

Lewis' father died when she was only three years old, leaving her mother to raise her alone. Her mother had been a school teacher prior to marriage and was instrumental in developing a keen affection for science learning in Graceanna. Esther Fussell Lewis made astronomy and weather observations as well as plant flowering times. She also serving as a role model in social activism by housing fugitive slaves as part of the Underground Railroad to freedom in Canada. Following her mother's death, Lewis made her own home available for this purpose, secretly providing overnight accommodation for as many as 11 runaways slaves at one time.

Lewis attended Kimberton Boarding School for Girls in neighboring Kimberton, Pennsylvania, at which she received instruction in many of the natural sciences, including astronomy, botany, chemistry, and zoology. Lewis also showed great aptitude as a painter of natural subjects.

== Career ==
Following the completion of her studies in 1842, she entered the teaching profession, which was one of the few career fields open to educated women in the day, taking a position as a teacher of botany and chemistry at a boarding school in York, Pennsylvania, run by her uncle Bartholomew Fussell.

Another women who influenced and inspired Lewis was her friend Mary Townsend, the sister of John Kirk Townsend. Mary had written a book on insects and Lewis expressed a wish to emulate her. During the 1850s Lewis moved to Philadelphia, where she worked closely with a small circle of Quakers who were active in the natural sciences. These included Ezra Michener and Vincent Bernard. She met one of America's leading ornithologists, John Cassin of the Philadelphia Academy of Natural Sciences, in 1862 and studied ornithology at an advanced level under his tutorship for the next half decade. In 1867 Cassin honored his protege with the naming of Icterus graceannae, the White-edged Oriole in Lewis's honor.

From the middle of the 1860s Lewis began to give private lectures on the field of ornithology in Philadelphia. Her area of interest and expertise gradually spread throughout her life to include the broad spectrum of natural history, including plants, animals, and minerals.

In 1868 Lewis published the book The Natural History of Birds, the first of an anticipated multi-part magnum opus. Unfortunately for Lewis, her patron Cassin died in 1869 and she was unable to obtain a teaching position in the field which would enable her to further advance her work.

Lewis's grand plans were also hampered by the fact that her ideas were seen by publishers as too complicated for a lay audience but not advanced enough for the scientific community. As a product of a devout religious upbringing, Lewis was critical of the Charles Darwin's theory of evolution for much of her life, instead positing that God was responsible for an intricate and well ordered universe. Only in the 1890s did Lewis come to accept some evolutionary ideas, still seeing the process as part and parcel of a grand theist system. Lewis particularly rejected Darwin's idea that random variation was part of the process behind natural selection, arguing instead that evolution was a divinely directed process for the perfection of supernaturally created species.

Held back by her theistic determinism and lack of higher education, Lewis was forced to limit herself to popular lectures on the naturalism to work as a freelance scientific illustrator, by which she made her living. With such an income stream unstable at best, in 1870 Lewis accepted a teaching position at the Philadelphia Friends School, where she would remain until the next year. On May 31, 1870, Lewis was elected to the Academy of Natural Sciences, after having garnered the support of two renowned local scientists: Joseph Leidy and George Washington Tryon, along with the Academy librarian Edward J. Nolan. Two of her articles were published in The American Naturalist journal shortly afterward.

In 1871 Lewis sold family land and used the proceeds to finance her further research. She envisioned a set of illustrative charts demonstrating the relationship of the plant and animal kingdoms, but she was unable to keep pace with the rapid influx of new information and was unwilling to publish her charts in an incomplete form, so the projects went unrealized.

Lewis twice lectured at Vassar College, in 1874 and 1879. She applied for a number of academic posts throughout the period, including a vacant professorship of natural history at Vassar, but owing to her lack of formal education beyond the high school level and a pervasive sexism in academia she was unable to land a college-level teaching position. Lewis instead returned to lower level teaching, working at the Foster School for Girls of Clifton Springs, New York, from 1883 to 1885.

In 1893 Lewis received a commission from the Pennsylvania Forestry Commission to paint a set of 50 watercolor illustrations of representative leaves of trees for display at the World's Columbian Exposition in Chicago. Lewis's work was regarded as a success, having won her a medal and a diploma, and the set of paintings was publicly displayed again at the 1901 Pan-American Exposition in Buffalo, New York, as well as the 1904 Louisiana Purchase Exposition in St. Louis.

She was a member of the Academy of Natural Sciences in Philadelphia and the Delaware County Institute of Science.

=== Social beliefs ===
In addition to her direct action against slavery as part of the secret network which aided escaped African-American slaves in their flight to freedom in the years prior to the American Civil War, Lewis was active in several other social movements of her day. In accordance with her Quaker religious beliefs, Lewis remained throughout her life a dedicated pacifist. She was also an activist in the movement for the prohibition of alcohol in the United States serving as Secretary of the Woman's Christian Temperance Union of Media, Pennsylvania, and as that organization's superintendent of scientific temperance instruction for Delaware County.

Lewis was also active in the movement for the granting of the right to vote to women. She presented a paper on "Science for Women" at the Third Congress of Women in Syracuse, New York in October 1875.

=== Death and legacy ===
Lewis spent the final decades of her life in her hometown of Media, Pennsylvania, with her nephew, artist Charles Lewis Fussell. She died there on February 25, 1912, at the age of 90, following a stroke, and was interred at the Providence Friends Meetinghouse Burying Grounds in Media.

Lewis's papers are part of the Lewis-Fussell Family Papers collection at Swarthmore College in Swarthmore, Pennsylvania. Included in this archival holding are Lewis's papers and drawings relating to the natural sciences, as well as an unpublished manuscript of a memoir of the Underground Railroad.

In 2014, a Commonwealth of Pennsylvania roadside historical marker honoring Lewis was erected in East Pikeland Township at 2123 Kimberton Road, Phoenixville, near the site of her family's farm.

== Works ==
=== Published work ===
- An Appeal to Those Members of the Society of Friends Who Knowing the Principles of the Abolitionists Stand Aloof from the Anti-Slavery Enterprise. n.c., n.p., n.d. [1840s].
- Natural History of Birds: Lectures on Ornithology. Philadelphia: J.A. Bancroft, 1868.
- The Position of Birds in the Animal Kingdom. 1869.
- "The Lyre Bird," American Naturalist, vol. 4, no. 6 (Aug. 1870), pp. 321–331.
- Symmetrical Figures in Birds' Feathers. Philadelphia: McCalla & Stavely, 1871.
- The Development of the Animal Kingdom: A Paper Read at the Fourth Meeting of the Association for the Advancement of Woman. Nantucket, MA: Hussey & Robinson, 1877.

=== Unpublished work ===
- Chart of the Animal Kingdom.
- Chart of the Vegetable Kingdom.
- A Chart of the Class of Birds.
- A Chart of Geology, with Special Reference to Paleontology.
- Microscopic Studies of Frost Crystals.
- Plumage of Birds.
- Lower Forms of Animal and Vegetable Life.
- Studies in Forestry, Illustrated by Watercolor Paintings.
- Water Color Paintings of Wild Flowers.
