= Media-Providence Friends School =

Coordinates: 39.92140°N 75.39125°W

- Media, PA, USA

Information
- School type: Private
- Established: 1876
- Headmaster: Jon Hall
- Grades: PK-8
- Gender: Co-educational
- Enrollment: 131
- Student to teacher ratio: 8:1
- Mascot: Dazzle the Dragon
- Affiliation: Quaker
- Website: www.mpfs.org

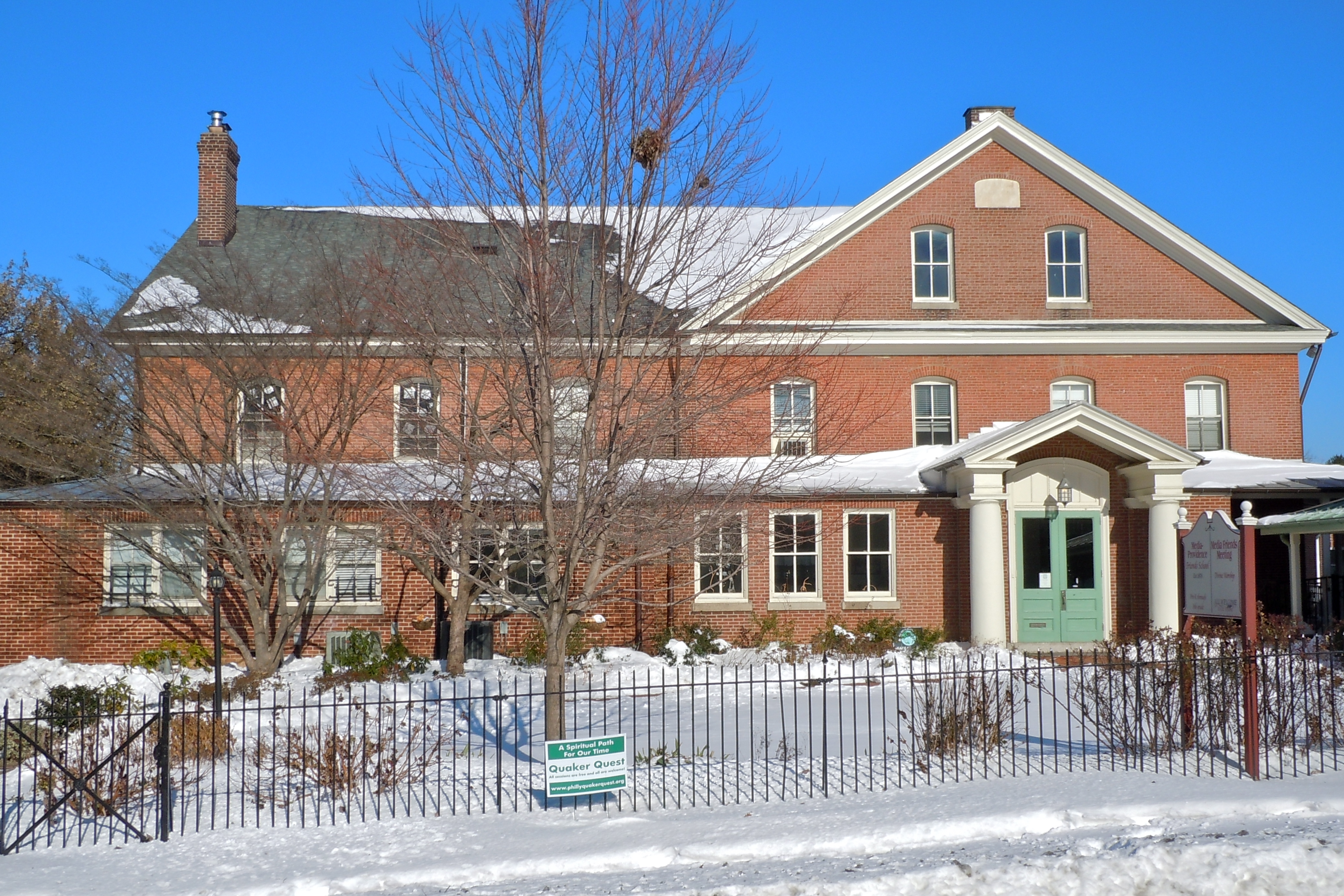
Media Friends Meeting, which houses the school

Media-Providence Friends School is a Quaker school founded as Media Friends School in Media, Pennsylvania in 1876.

== History and facilities ==
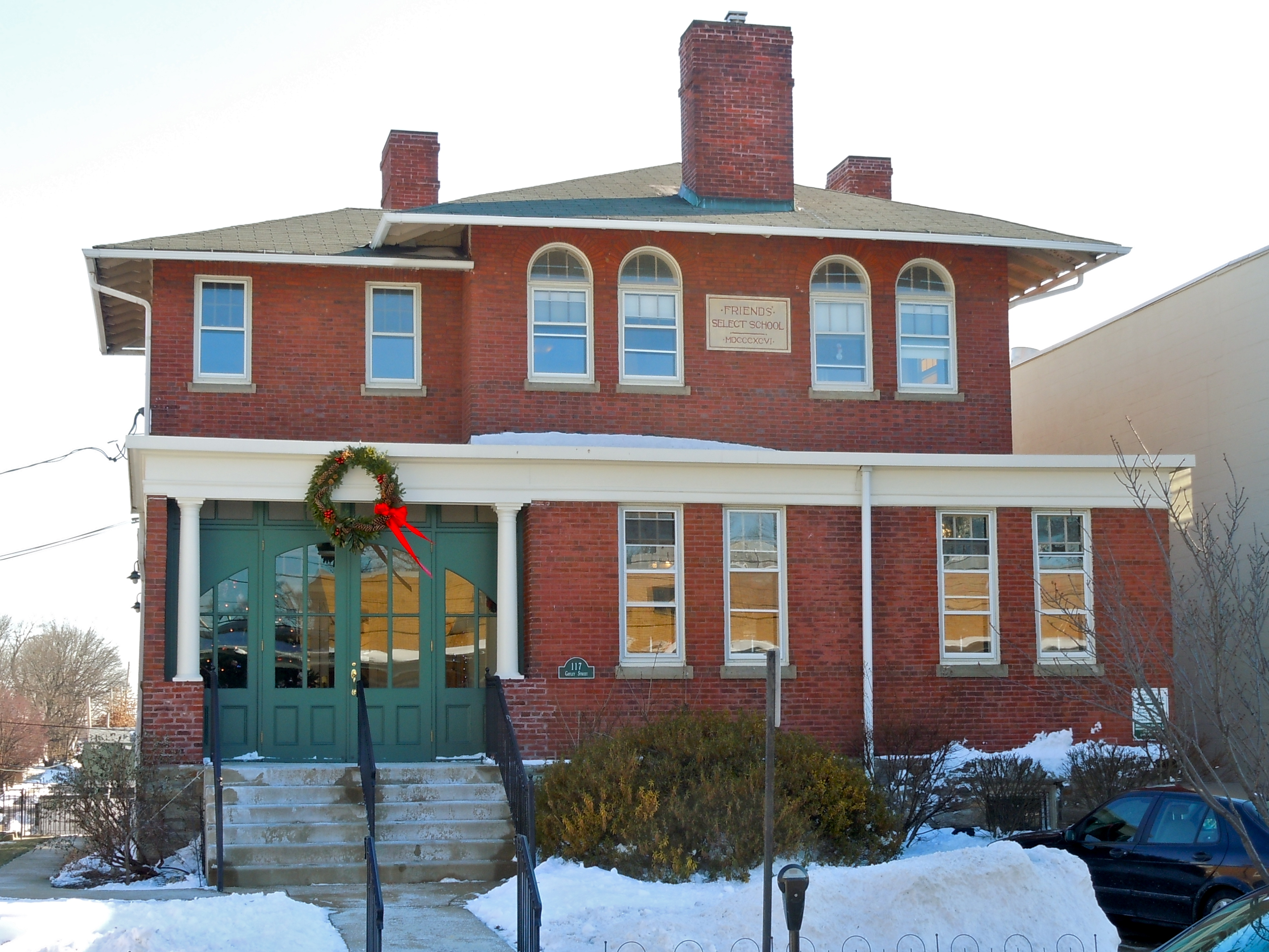
1896 building on Gayley Street near Baltimore Pike

In 1876 the members of Chester Monthly Meeting in Media, which was later renamed Media Monthly Meeting, started the school over a small stable on Baltimore Pike. Students included non-Friends, as well as members of the orthodox Chester Monthly Meeting and the Hicksite Providence Friends Meeting in Media. At the beginning of the century the Quaker religious meeting moved to 125 West 3rd Street and expanded. The small brick school building was built in 1896 with additions added in 1908 and 1918.

Later the school moved into the building on 3rd Street. The west end of the main building was changed in 1935 when space was needed to create three more classrooms. In 1957, the Social Room, and the meeting room were remodeled to create classrooms above it. A school office and lounge were added in 1965; in 1973 more changes were made when the school expanded to eighth grade. In 1991 a major addition of a gymnasium and four more classrooms were completed. These classrooms included a science classroom and a foreign language classroom. It is referred to as the Middle School Building because middle school students have home room there in addition to humanities and mathematics classes.

Most recently, in 2006, a new classroom building was completed that currently houses the first and second grade classes. During this period of renovation the small brick 1886 building was renovated. There is now a brick central courtyard that connects the new building to the main building with a covered walkway.

== See also ==
- List of Friends schools
