= Media, Pennsylvania =

Borough in Pennsylvania, US

Media
- Borough
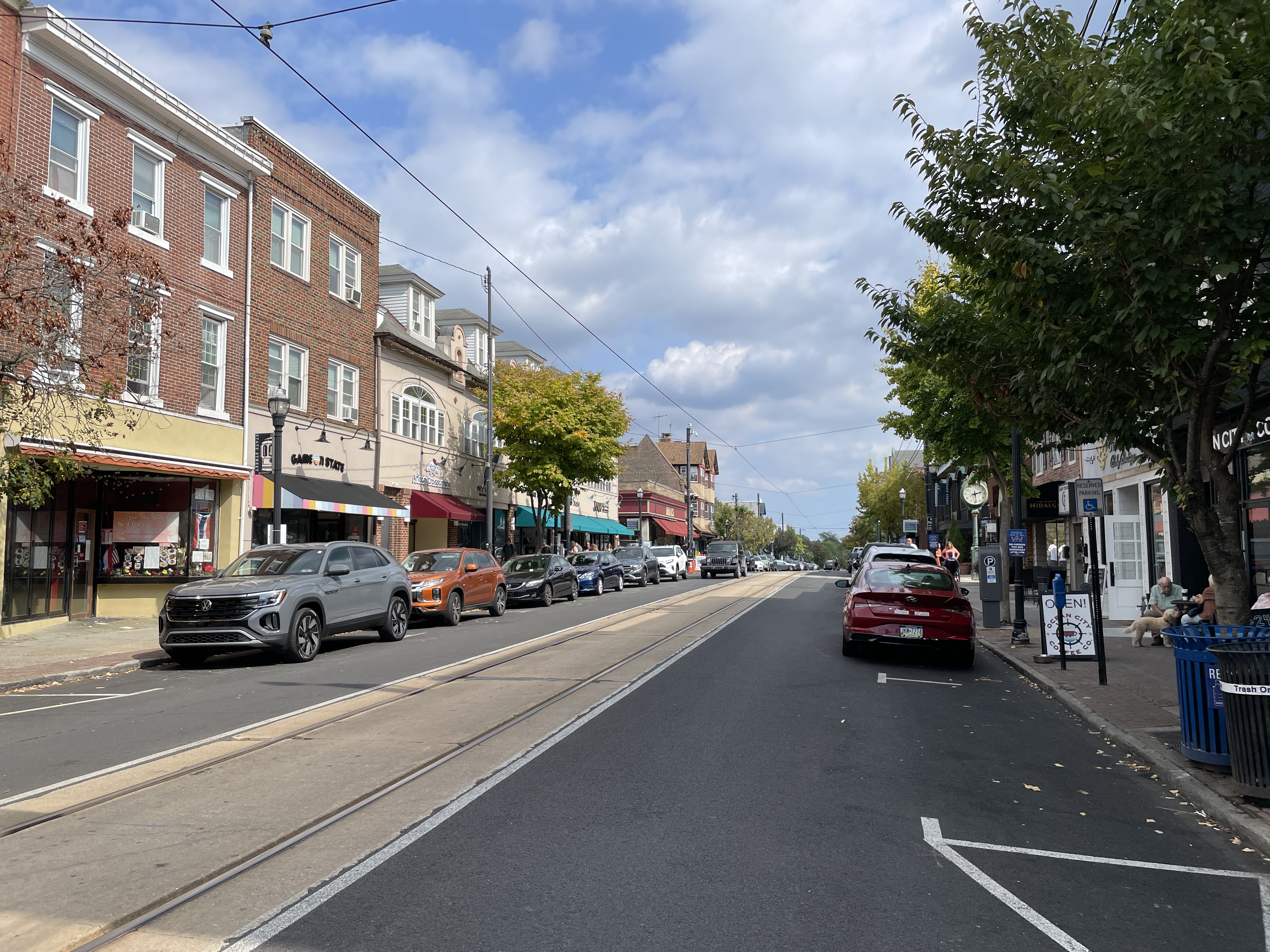
- State Street in Media, September 2024

- Seal
- Nickname: Everybody's Hometown
- Location of Media in Delaware County (top) and of Delaware County the U.S. state of Pennsylvania (below)

- Location of Media in Pennsylvania Media (the United States)
- Coordinates: 39°55′08″N 75°23′21″W
- Country: United States
- State: Pennsylvania
- County: Delaware
- Settled: 1681

Government
  - Mayor: Joi Washington (D)

Area
  - Total: 0.76 sq mi (1.98 km^{2})
  - Land: 0.76 sq mi (1.98 km^{2})
  - Water: 0.0039 sq mi (0.01 km^{2})

Population (2020)
  - Total: 5,901
  - Density: 7,736.6/sq mi (2,987.11/km^{2})
- Time zone: UTC−5 (EST)
  - Summer (DST): UTC−4 (EDT)
- ZIP Codes: 19063, 19065, 19091
- Area codes: 610 and 484
- FIPS code: 42-48480
- GNIS feature ID: 1180858
- Website: www.mediaborough.com

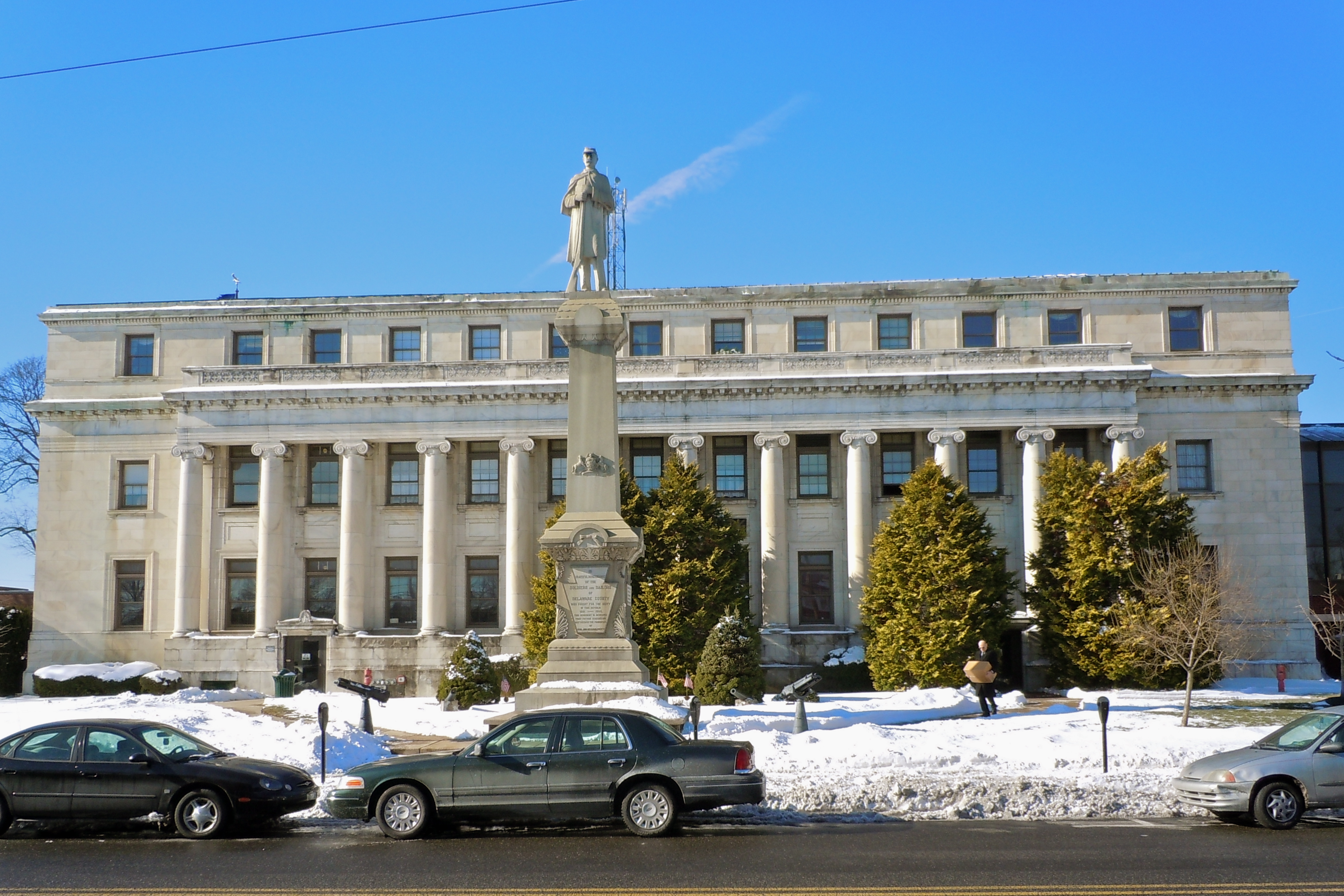
Delaware County Courthouse

Media is a borough in and the county seat of Delaware County, Pennsylvania, United States. It is located about 13 miles (21 km) west of Philadelphia. It is part of the Philadelphia metropolitan area.

Media was incorporated in 1850 at the same time that it was named the county seat. As of the 2020 census, the population was 5,991.

== History ==
The history of the area goes back to William Penn, but the area remained predominantly rural until the 20th century.

=== 17th century ===
Land in the area was sold and settled soon after William Penn was named proprietor of the colonial-era Province of Pennsylvania in 1681 by King Charles II of England. Peter and William Taylor bought the land where Media is now located, directly from Penn. At the time, the land was located in Chester County. Providence Township was organized in 1684, and later divided into Upper Providence and Nether Providence townships by 1690, even though they only had 40 taxable properties at the time. The current borough, formed in 1850, sits between the two townships.

In 1683, the Court of Chester County approved the construction of "Providence Great Road", now Pennsylvania Route 252. The road, which runs north from Chester to within a few blocks of today's downtown, is shown on a 1687 map along with the names of local landowners. It forms the eastern border of the borough.

Thomas Minshall, a Quaker, was an early Media resident, settling just outside the small village then known as "Providence", along Providence Great Road. The village then included a tailor shop, blacksmith shop, wheelwright shop, barn and other buildings.

Minshall bought 625 acres (253 ha) from William Penn and arrived in 1682. The Providence Friends Meetinghouse was established at his house in February 1688.

=== 18th century ===
The original Friends Meetinghouse was built out of logs in 1699 or 1700, and the current building was completed in 1814. A house on Minshall's property, built around 1750, still stands and was given to the citizens of the borough in 1975.

In 1789, Chester County, Pennsylvania was divided, with the eastern portion becoming Delaware County, Pennsylvania.

=== 19th century ===
The area in the center of the new county remained rural through 1850. On March 11, 1850, the Commonwealth of Pennsylvania by Special Act of Assembly incorporated the Borough of Media, and made the sale of malt and spirituous liquors unlawful within its borders. At the same time, the county seat of Delaware County was moved to Media from Chester. The borough was formed from four farms purchased by the county, totaling only 480 acres (190 ha). The borders of the borough have not changed since that time.

Streets were plotted in a rectangular grid around the location of the new courthouse, lots were sold at public auctions, and the construction of houses began. Sources agree that Minshall Painter, a descendant of Thomas Minshall, suggested the name "Media", but do not agree on the reason. The name most likely comes from the borough's median location in the direct center of Delaware County.

=== 20th century ===
In 1940, the Pennsylvania guide described Media by noting that "[t]he majority of its houses, almost all built since the American Civil War, sit far back on shaded lawns and seem somewhat gloomy. The borough has a large and prosperous business section and a few small industrial plants; many townspeople work in Philadelphia or Chester."

The John J. Tyler Arboretum occupies part of Thomas Minshall's original 625 acres (253 ha). This farm and a nearby Village of Lima was used by the Underground Railroad. The land was donated to a public trust in 1944 by an eighth-generation descendant. The arboretum was started as a private collection by brothers Jacob and Minshall Painter. In 1825, they began systematically planting over 1,000 varieties of trees and shrubs. Over twenty of their original trees survive, including a giant sequoia.

Minshall Painter was also a leader of the Delaware County Institute of Science, which was formed on September 21, 1833, with just four other members: George Miller, John Miller, George Smith, M.D., and John Cassin. The institute was incorporated in 1836. About 1850, Painter gave the institute the land where its building currently stands at 11 Veterans Square, and the building was constructed in 1867.

In the second half of the 19th century, Media was a summer resort for well-to-do Philadelphians. The borough's large vacation hotels included the Idlewild Hotel (1871) on Lincoln Street at Gayley Terrace, Chestnut Grove House or "The Colonial" (1860) on Orange Street, and Brooke Hall on Orange Street and Washington Avenue (now Baltimore Avenue). The Chestnut Grove was used for a year by nearby Swarthmore College due to a fire on its campus.

The West Chester and Philadelphia Railroad was built through Media on October 19, 1854. Electrified service was opened on December 2, 1928. Up to 50 trains passed through each day. The railroad became part of the Philadelphia, Wilmington and Baltimore Railroad and eventually the Penn Central. SEPTA took over operations in 1983. Woodrow Wilson spoke at the Media Station in 1912 during his first election campaign. Trolley transportation lines spread to and through Media in the 1890s and early 1900s.

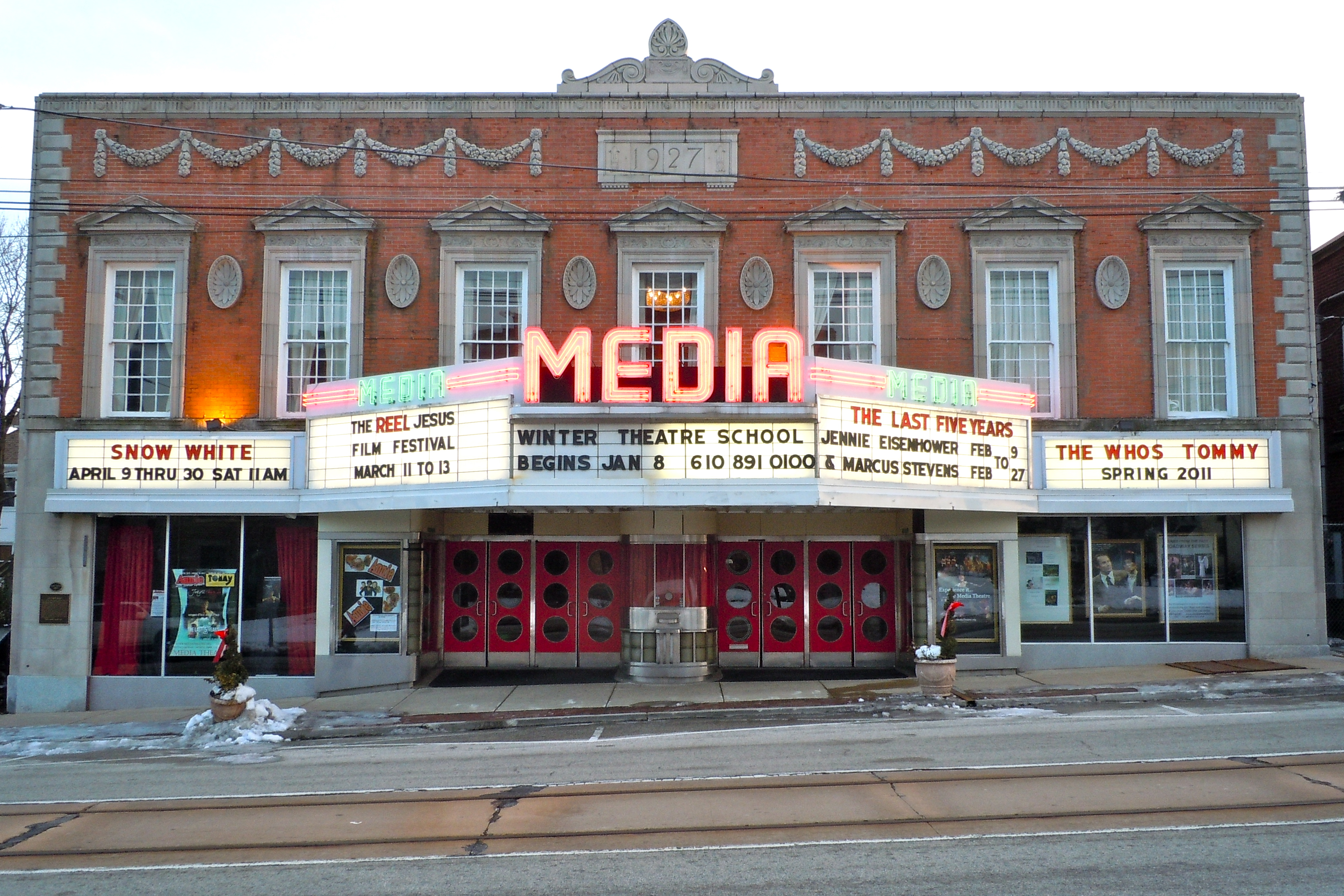
The Media Theatre for the Performing Arts

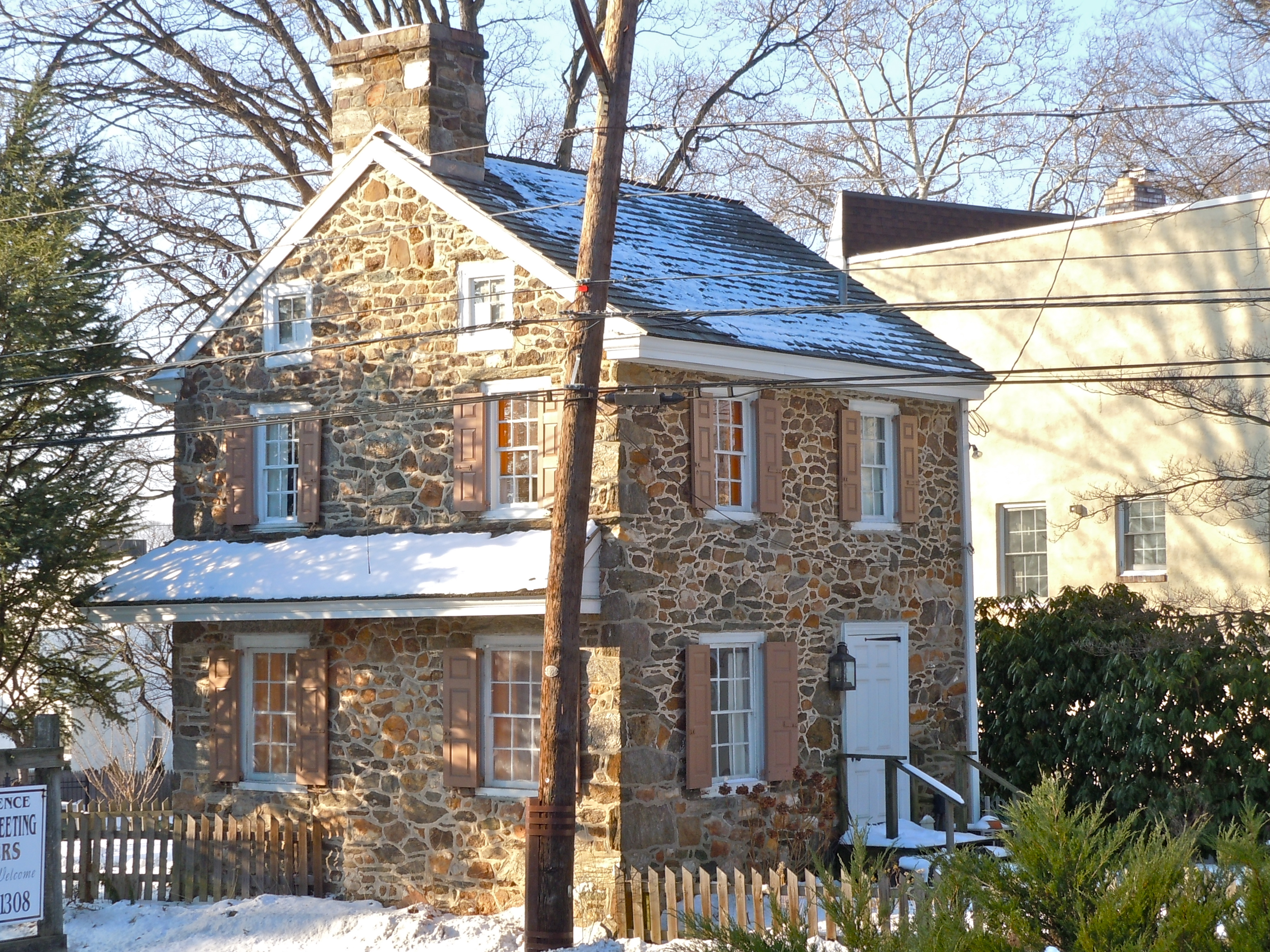
Thomas Minshall house

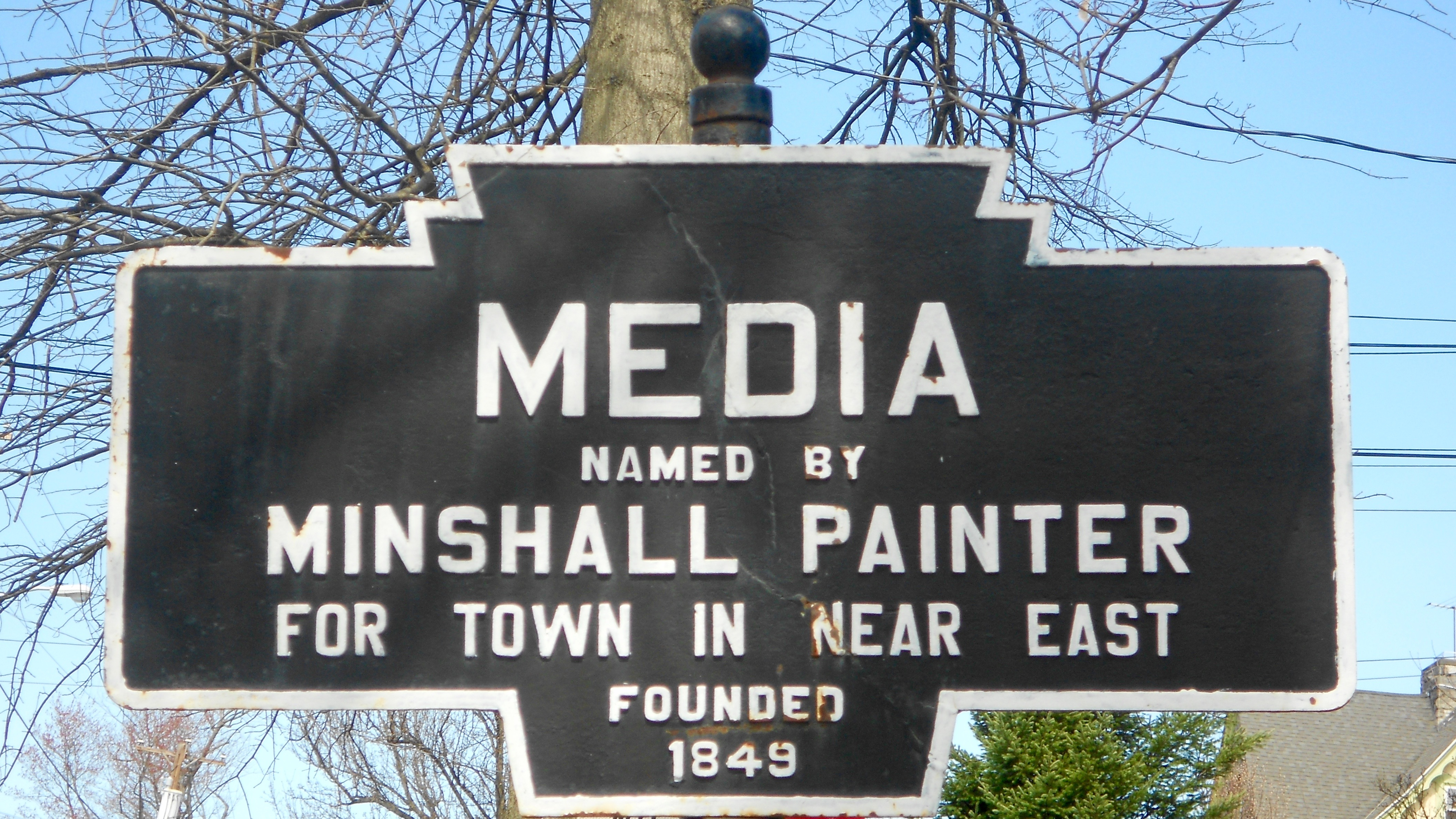
Keystone Marker from the 1920s gives one version of the origin of the town's name

External videos
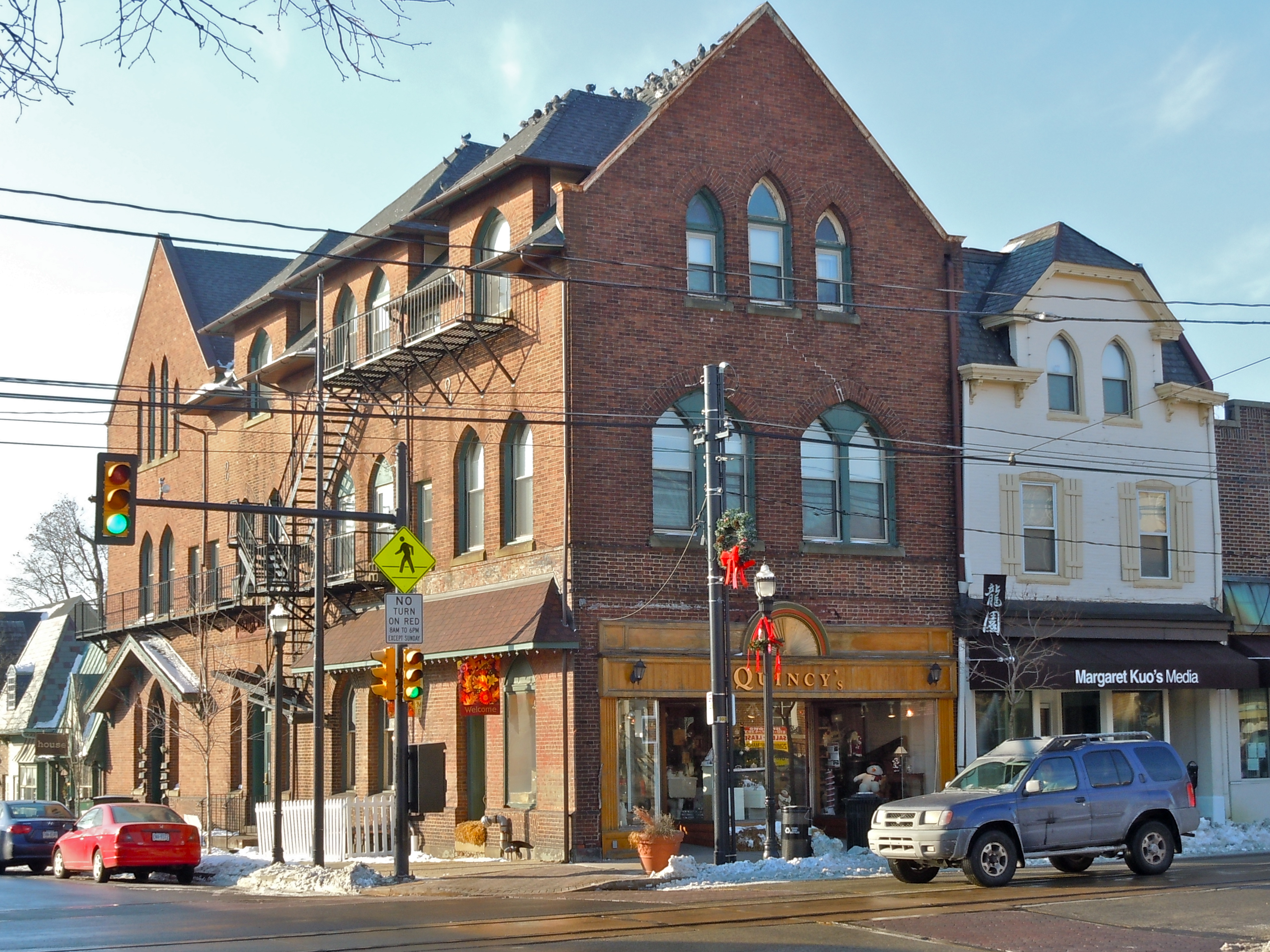
- Media, PA - Walking Tour, by Wanda Kaluza
- Media, PA CoyopaFilms

The Media Theatre opened as a vaudeville house in 1927. The first talkie film, The Jazz Singer, was shown there. It remained a popular cinema through the 1970s and 1980s. In 1994, the theater underwent a $1 million (~$1.97 million in 2025) restoration by Walter Strine Sr. and re-opened as the Media Theatre for the Performing Arts. Shows produced there have included The Full Monty, Carousel and Miss Saigon.

On March 8, 1971, the Citizens' Commission to Investigate the FBI raided an FBI "resident agency" in Media. They later released thousands of documents to major newspapers around the country. These documents revealed FBI tactics such as the illegal wiretapping of civil rights leaders like Martin Luther King Jr. and the recruitment of Boy Scouts as informants, and confirmed for the first time the existence of COINTELPRO, an FBI program to "expose, disrupt, misdirect, discredit, or otherwise neutralize" dissident groups in the United States.

=== 21st century ===
In June 2006, Media became the first town in the United States to follow over 300 towns in Europe in attaining fair trade certification. To meet the criteria for certification, Media passed a council resolution in support of fair trade, served fair-trade coffee and tea in local government meetings and offices, ensured that a range of fair-trade products were available in local restaurants and businesses, raised popular support and provided media coverage for the fair-trade campaign, and convened a fair-trade steering committee to ensure continued commitment.

== Local historic districts ==
Three locally recognized historic districts were designated by the borough in 1975. These districts are:

- Courthouse Square, from Olive to Orange Streets between 2nd and Jasper Streets.
- Lemon Street, from Baker to Front Streets.
- Providence Friends' Meeting House District, from Front to 2nd including the meetinghouse to Haldeman.

== Landmarks ==
=== Homes ===
- Minshall House (c.1750) on Route 252
- Cooper House (before 1870) on State Street, home of Thomas Valentine Cooper, Pennsylvania State Senator and Representative
- Dr. Samuel D. Risley House (1877), 430 N. Monroe Street
- Gayley House (1855) 301 Gayley St., originally the Media Classical Institute, a Presbyterian academy founded by Rev. Samuel Maxwell Gayley. In 1923, the building became a convent for Nativity BVM Catholic Church. It has served as Nativity's parish center since 2005.
- Hillhurst (1890) on Orange Street, designed by Addison Hutton and owned by John Biddle as a summer home.
- Jaisohn House (1925), 100 East Lincoln Street

=== Municipal/civic ===
- Delaware County Institute of Science (1867) on Veterans Square. The institute was founded in 1833.
- Delaware County Courthouse (1871) on Front Street
- First National Bank of Media (1900) on State Street at Veterans Square, designed by Albert Dilks
- Media Armory (1908) on State St., designed by William Lightfoot Price and M H. McClanahan. Added to the National Register of Historic Places in 1989. Now home to the Media Armory and Trader Joe's grocery store.
- Media Theatre (1927, restored 1994) on State St., designed by Louis Magaziner as a Beaux-Arts movie palace with Art Deco design elements.
- Old Rose Tree Tavern (1809), listed on the National Register of Historic Places in 1971
- The County Court Apartments, location of historic marker documenting the Citizens' Commission to Investigate the FBI raid in 1971 that exposed COINTELPRO and mass FBI violations of the rights of U.S. citizens.

=== Churches ===
- Media Vineyard Church
- Campbell A.M.E (African Methodist Episcopal) Church
- Christ Church (Episcopalian)
- Congregation Beth Israel, in Middletown Township - the oldest Reconstructionist congregation in the Philadelphia metropolitan area, founded in 1925.
- Faith Reformed Baptist Church
- First Baptist Church of Media
- First United Methodist
- Honeycomb Union AME Church
- Media Presbyterian Church (1855) on Baltimore Ave. designed by John McArthur Jr., architect of Philadelphia City Hall.
- Brooke Hall Female Seminary (1856) Finishing school at Lemon St. and Baltimore Ave, attended by future first lady, Ida (Sexton) McKinley.
- Media Presbyterian Church
- Nativity BVM Church (1882) 30 E. Franklin St. Designed by Philadelphia ecclesiastical architect, Edwin Durang.
- The Brick Church (1862) Nativity BVM's original church. Used as a school (1882–c.1950) after the main church was built. Currently used as a hall.
- Quaker meetinghouses: Media Friends Meeting and Providence Friends Meetinghouse.
- Media Monthly Meeting of the Religious Society of Friends (1875) and Media-Providence Friends School (1876), both located at 125 W. 3rd Street
- St. George (Greek Orthodox)
- Second Baptist Church of Media
- Trinity U.A.M.E. (Union American Methodist Episcopal) Church
- Unitarian Universalist Church of Delaware County

=== Parks ===
There are several parks located within the borough of Media and shared with surrounding communities.

- Rose Tree Park
- Glen Providence Park
- Houtman Park
- Cherry Street Field
- Scott Park
- Ridley Creek State Park

Media, Pennsylvania

Climate chart (precipitation, max. and min. temperature)
| J | F | M | A | M | J | J | A | S | O | N | D |
| 2.9 39 28 | 2.8 43 30 | 3.6 52 37 | 3.3 63 46 | 4.2 74 56 | 3.2 83 65 | 4 88 70 | 3.3 85 68 | 4.2 77 61 | 2.8 65 50 | 3.2 54 41 | 3.1 44 33 |
- █ Average max. and min. temperatures in °F
- █ Precipitation totals in inches
- Source: The Weather Channel
Metric conversion
| J | F | M | A | M | J | J | A | S | O | N | D |
| 74 4 −2 | 70 6 −1 | 92 11 3 | 83 17 8 | 106 23 13 | 81 28 18 | 102 31 21 | 84 29 20 | 107 25 16 | 72 18 10 | 82 12 5 | 79 7 1 |
- █ Average max. and min. temperatures in °C
- █ Precipitation totals in mm

== Geography and climate ==
Media is located in central Delaware County at 39°55′8″N 75°23′17″W (39.918761, -75.388127).

According to the United States Census Bureau, the borough has a total area of 0.77 square miles (2.0 km^{2}), of which 0.004 square miles (0.01 km^{2}), or 0.42%, is water. Media is situated on high ground (250 to 350 feet (76 to 107 m) above sea level) draining west to Ridley Creek, a south-flowing tributary of the Delaware River.

Media has a humid subtropical climate (Cfa) and the hardiness zone is 7a.

== Demographics ==
Historical population
| Census | Pop. | Note | %± |
|---|---|---|---|
| 1850 | 285 | | — |
| 1860 | 2,397 | | 741.1% |
| 1870 | 1,045 | | −56.4% |
| 1880 | 1,919 | | 83.6% |
| 1890 | 2,736 | | 42.6% |
| 1900 | 3,075 | | 12.4% |
| 1910 | 3,562 | | 15.8% |
| 1920 | 4,109 | | 15.4% |
| 1930 | 5,372 | | 30.7% |
| 1940 | 5,351 | | −0.4% |
| 1950 | 5,726 | | 7.0% |
| 1960 | 5,803 | | 1.3% |
| 1970 | 6,444 | | 11.0% |
| 1980 | 6,119 | | −5.0% |
| 1990 | 5,957 | | −2.6% |
| 2000 | 5,533 | | −7.1% |
| 2010 | 5,327 | | −3.7% |
| 2020 | 5,901 | | 10.8% |

As of the 2020 census, the racial makeup of the borough was 82.9% White, 3.5% African American, 0.4% Native American, 5.7% Asian, 2.6% from Hawaiian and Pacific Islander, 3.9% from two or more races, and 2.5% from Hispanic or Latino of any race.

At the time of the 2010 Census, the racial makeup of the borough was 83.4% White, 10.6% African American, 0.1% Native American, 3.5% Asian, 0.5% from other races, and 1.9% from two or more races. Hispanic or Latino of any race were 2.5% of the population.

== Media ZIP Code ==
The term "Media" is often used to include not only the borough of Media, but other municipalities but that share the ZIP Code. The borough of Media covers only 0.8 square miles (2.1 square kilometres) and less than 6,000 residents, but the Media ZIP Code 19063 covers 23.08 sq mi (59.8 km^{2}) and a population of 35,704.

According to the United States Postal Service, the following addresses are included in the 19063 ZIP Code: Elwyn, Garden City, Glen Riddle, and Rose Valley. Other areas at least partially included in the 19063 zip code are Upper Providence Township; Nether Providence Township, the neighborhoods of South Media, Bowling Green, Pine Ridge and Ridgewood; and most of Middletown Township, including, Bortondale, Riddlewood, and Lima.

== Government ==
The borough of Media is run by a mayor and an elected council. Mark Paikoff is the president of the Media Borough Council, and Elizabeth Romaine is the vice-president. As of April 2024, the other Council members are Kevin Boyer, Lisa Gelman, Jen Malkoun, Tray Herman, and Joi Washington.

In 2025, Joi Washington was elected mayor, becoming the first woman to hold the office. A member of the borough council since 2022, she won the mayoral race with 77 percent of the vote against Kevin Kellogg, a Republican. Washington succeeds Mayor Bob McMahon, a Democrat who had served as mayor since being elected 1992. Upon taking office, Washington identified road safety and the reduction of traffic fatalities as her early priorities.

United States presidential election results for Media, Pennsylvania
| Year | Republican | | Democratic | | Third party(ies) | |
| Year | No. | % | No. | % | No. | % |
|---|---|---|---|---|---|---|
| 2024 | 1,029 | 26.25% | 2,846 | 72.60% | 45 | 1.15% |
| 2020 | 948 | 24.15% | 2,929 | 74.62% | 48 | 1.22% |
| 2016 | 833 | 24.77% | 2,361 | 70.21% | 169 | 5.03% |
| 2012 | 1015 | 30.63% | 2,299 | 69.37% | 0 | 0.00% |
| 2008 | 889 | 27.62% | 2,276 | 70.71% | 54 | 1.68% |

=== Politics ===
Media is a Democratic-leaning borough, delivering strong support for Democratic candidates in federal, state, and local elections.

== Education ==
=== Primary and secondary schools ===
Media lies within the Rose Tree Media School District, created by a merger with the Rose Tree Union School District and Media Borough School District in 1966. Public school students living within borough boundaries attend Media Elementary School, located in Downtown Media, for grades K-5. Springton Lake Middle School serves students in grades 6–8, and Penncrest High School serves students in grades 9–12.

The Media-Upper Providence Friends School is the only private school in the borough.

Mother of Providence Regional Catholic School in Wallingford is the area Catholic school of the Roman Catholic Archdiocese of Philadelphia. It formed in 2012 from a merger of Nativity BVM School, which was Media's only pariochal school and St. John Chrysostom in Wallingford. Nativity BVM school opened in 1912, with its last building occupied in 1949. The Nativity BVM school administration chose not to file an appeal against the 2012 order to merge. Some parents had lobbied for the continued operation of the school. The archdiocese had originally planned to make Nativity BVM the regional campus, but changed when St. John Chrystosom had appealed the decision. After the closure, Media Elementary School occupied the campus while renovations of the permanent Media Elementary occurred.

=== Tertiary education ===
The following are in townships around Media, and have Media mailing addresses:

- Delaware County Community College, a two-year liberal arts college, has its main Delaware County campus in Marple Township; this campus has a Media mailing address
- Pennsylvania Institute of Technology, a two-year junior college, in Upper Providence Township
- Penn State Brandywine, in Middletown Township
- Williamson College of the Trades, a three-year technical college, in Middletown Township

== Transportation ==
=== Highways ===
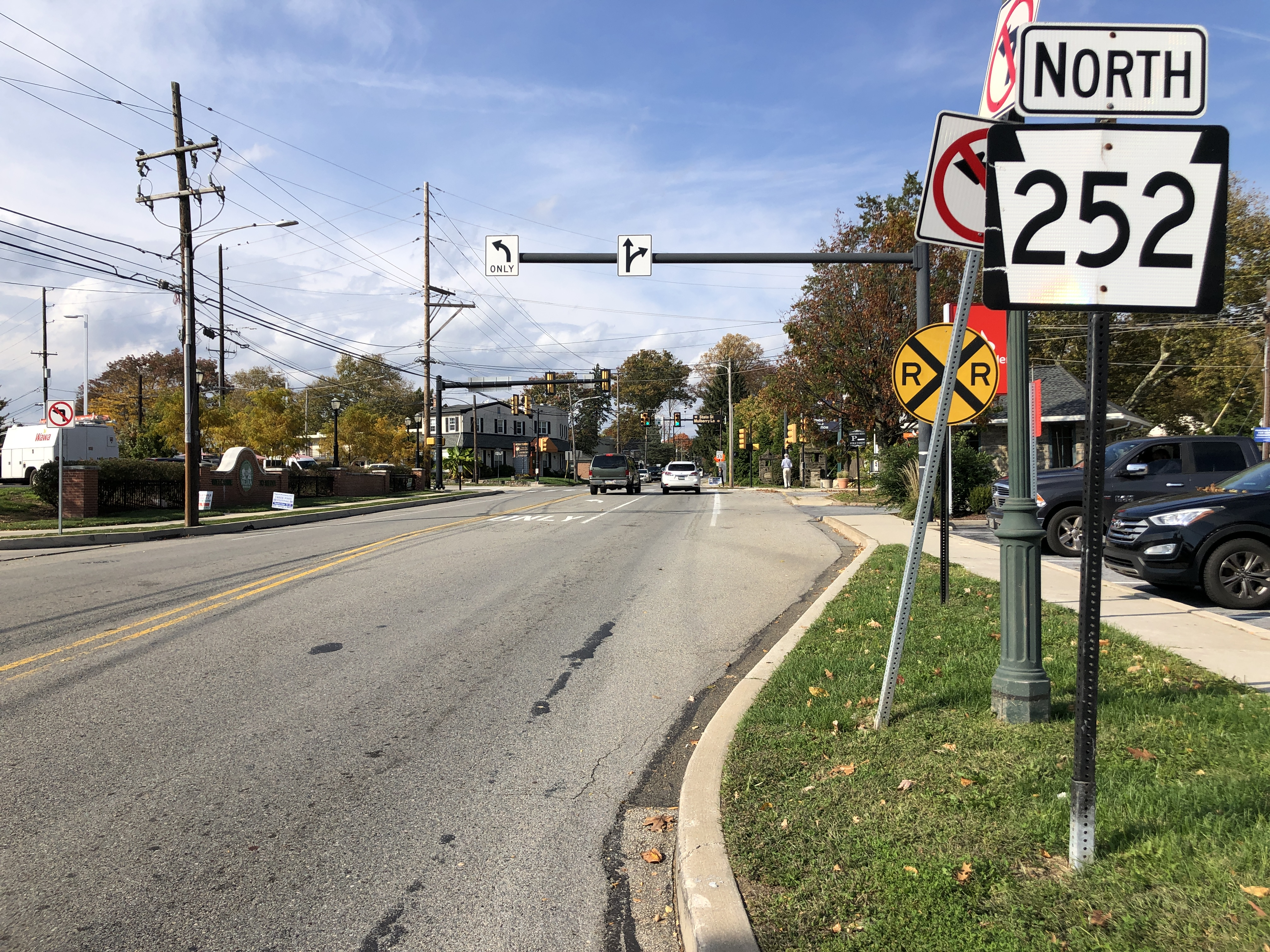
PA Route 252 northbound in Media

As of 2018, there were 18.29 miles (29.43 km) of public roads in Media, of which 3.40 miles (5.47 km) were maintained by the Pennsylvania Department of Transportation (PennDOT) and 14.89 miles (23.96 km) were maintained by the borough.

Route 252, Providence Road, is the only numbered highway presently traversing the borough. It follows a north–south alignment along the eastern border of Media.

U.S. 1 formerly ran through the borough until the Media Bypass was completed in 1960. The bypass has an unusual "volleyball" or three-level diamond interchange with Interstate 476. The former Route 1 through the center of Media is known by its older name, Baltimore Avenue, changing to Baltimore Pike outside the borough limits.

=== Airports ===
Philadelphia International Airport (PHL), the 21st-busiest airport in the nation in 2022, is 11 miles' driving distance (about a 15-minute drive) from downtown Media, following Baltimore Pike east, then Interstate 476 south and Interstate 95 northeast.

=== SEPTA rail ===
- Media station is a SEPTA rail station of the Media/Wawa Line.
- The D1 is a SEPTA Metro light rail line that runs through Media to the 69th Street Transportation Center in Upper Darby. The trolley line ends in Media at Media-Orange Street station.

== Gallery ==
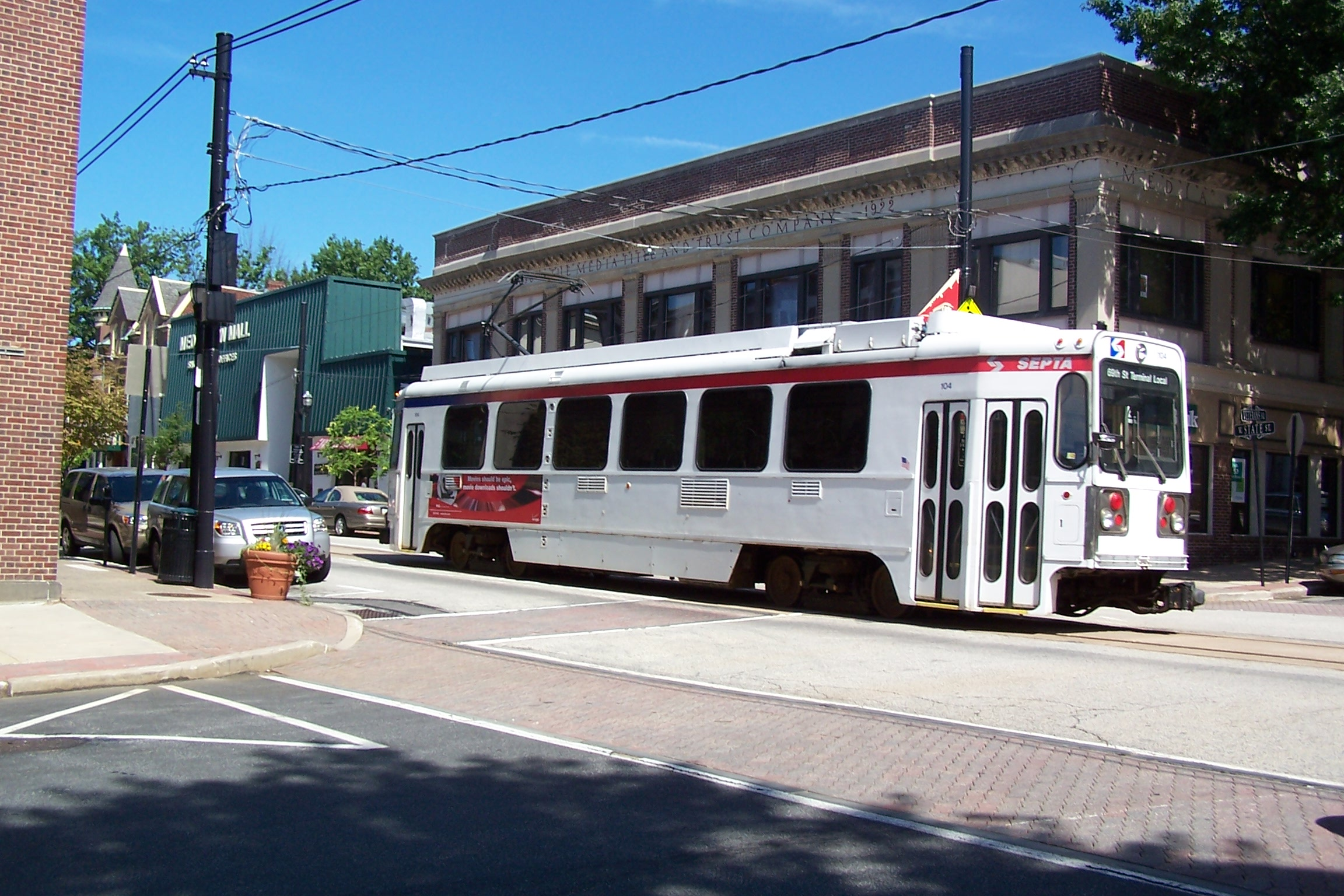
SEPTA trolley on State Street

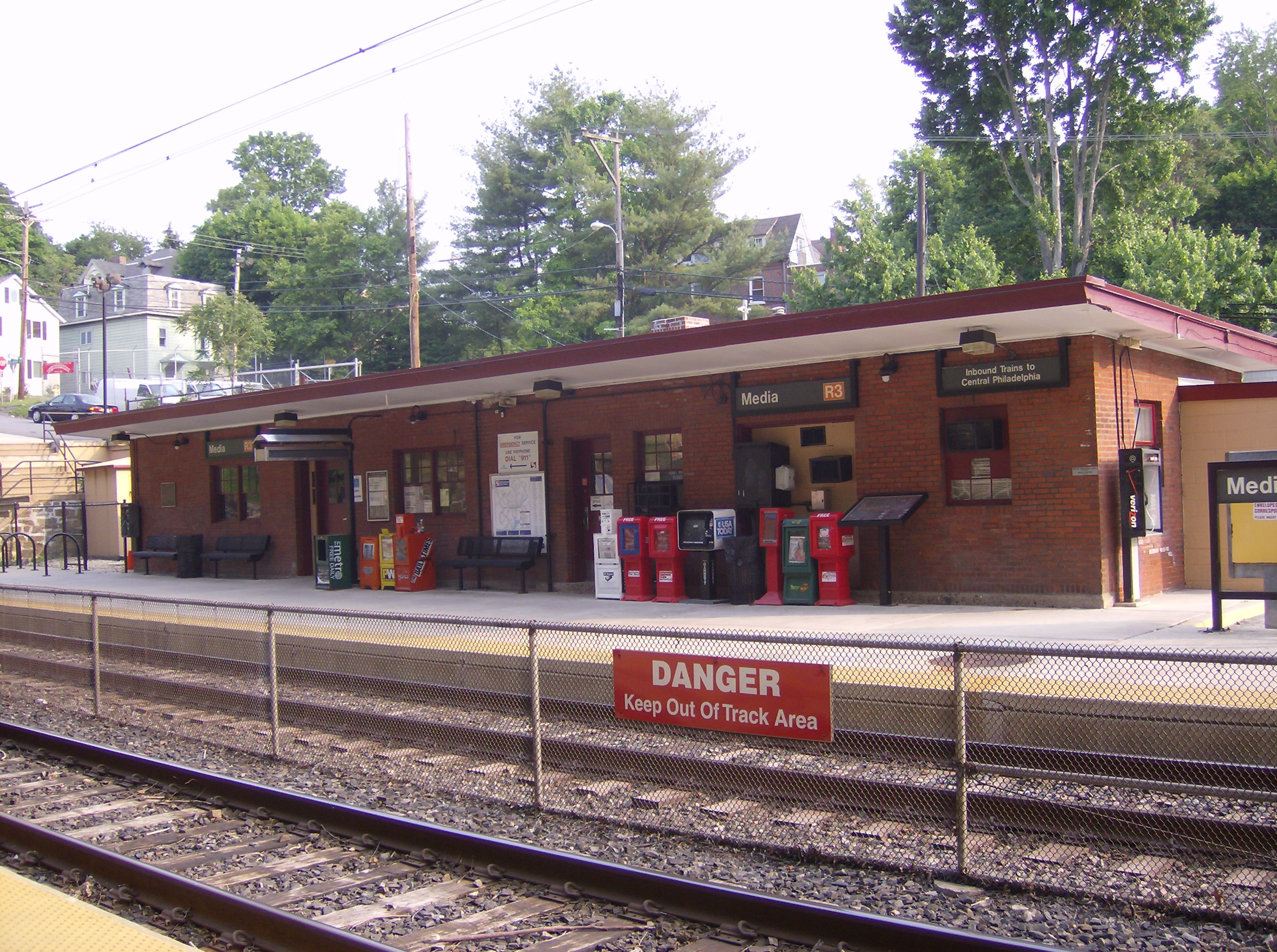
Media Station

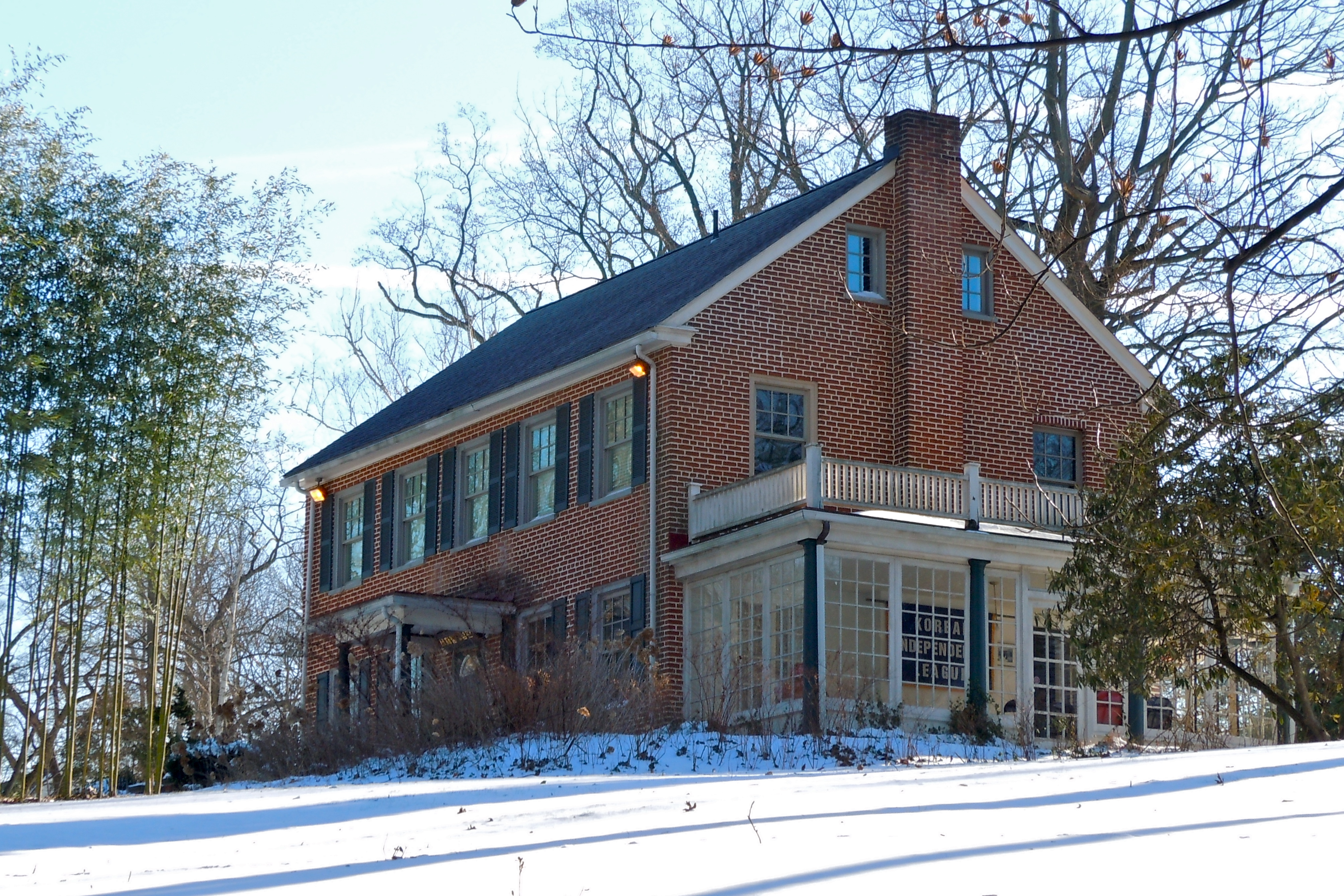
Philip Jaisohn House

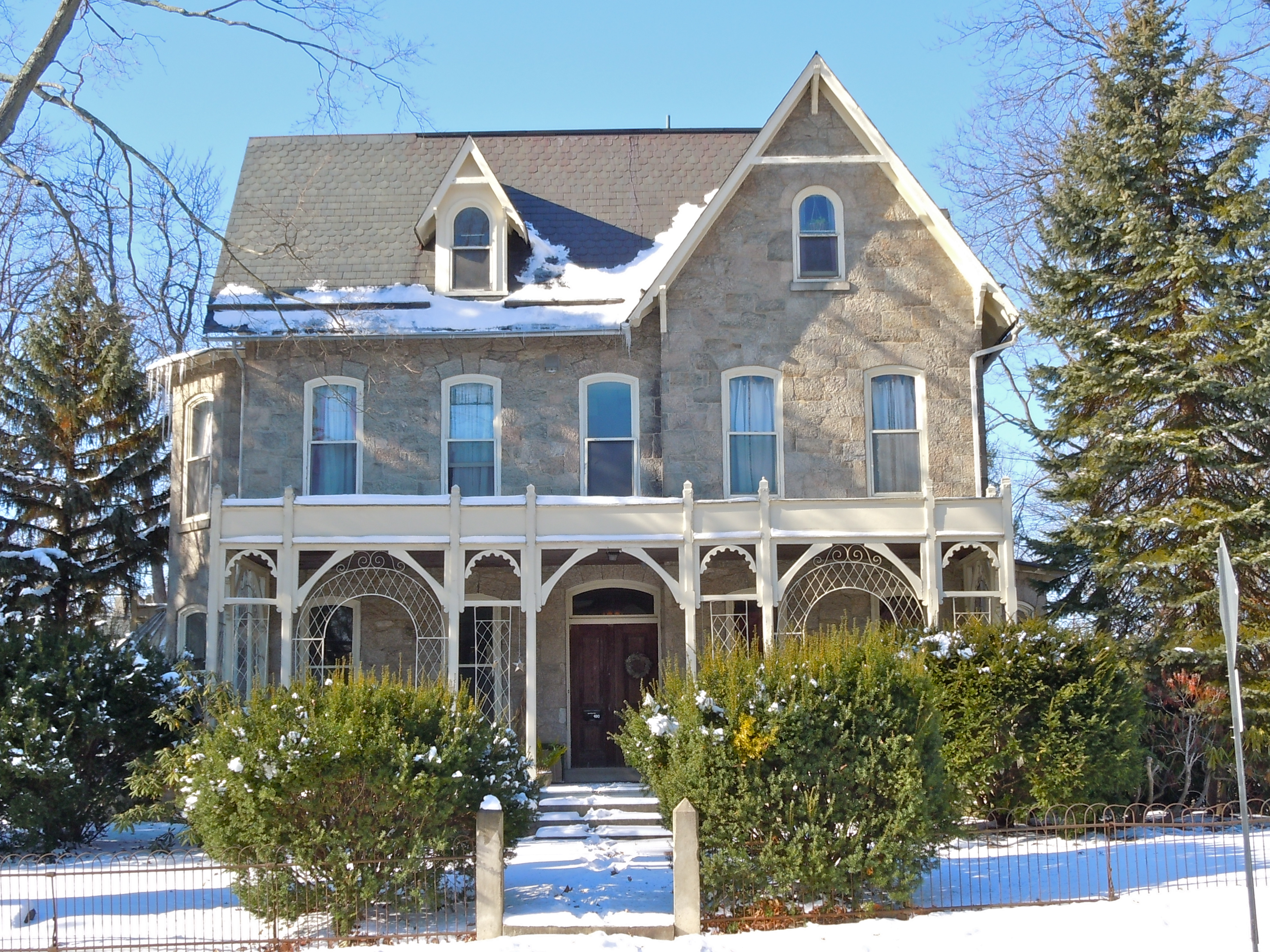
Samuel Risley House

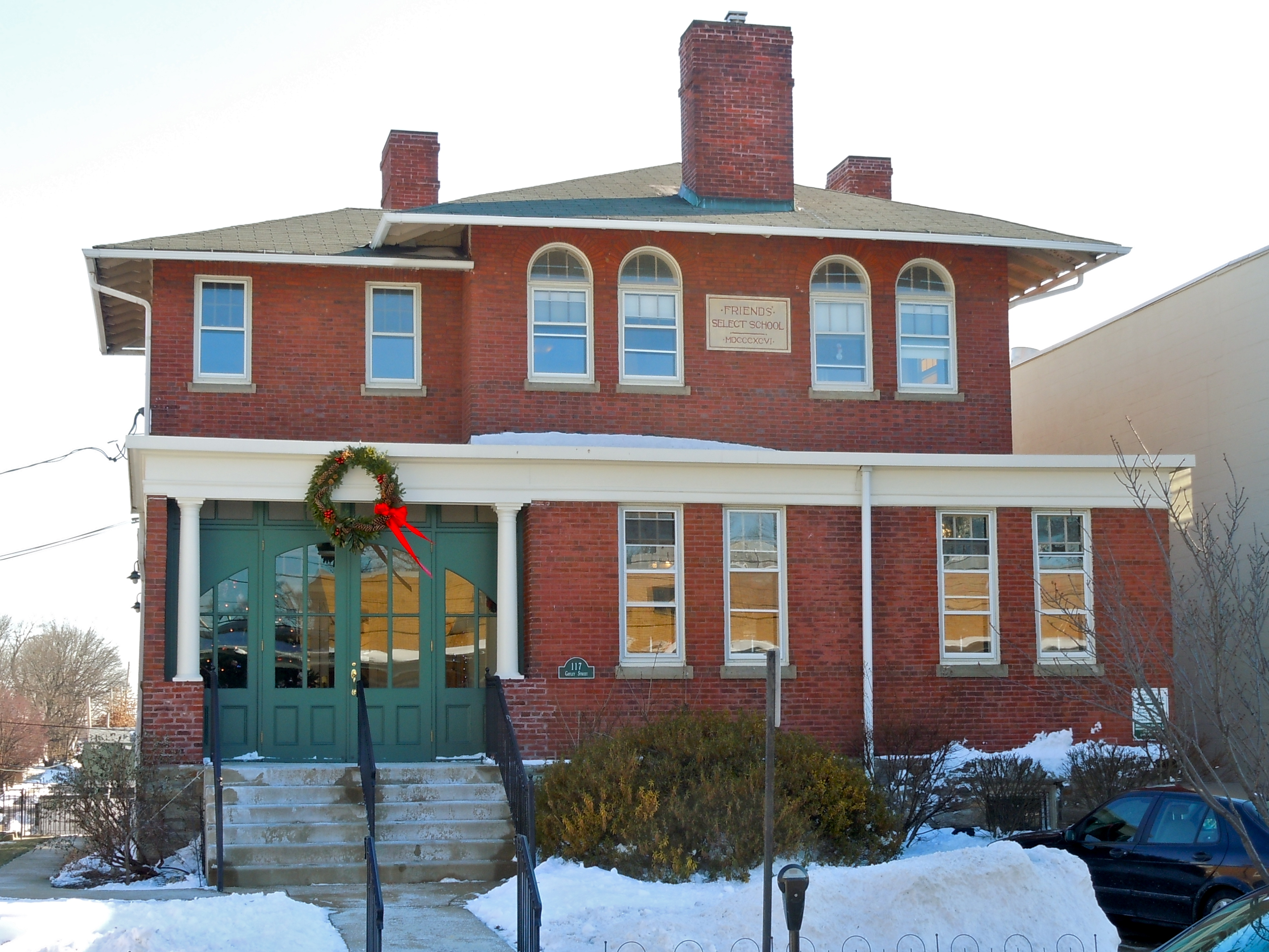
Old Friends Select School

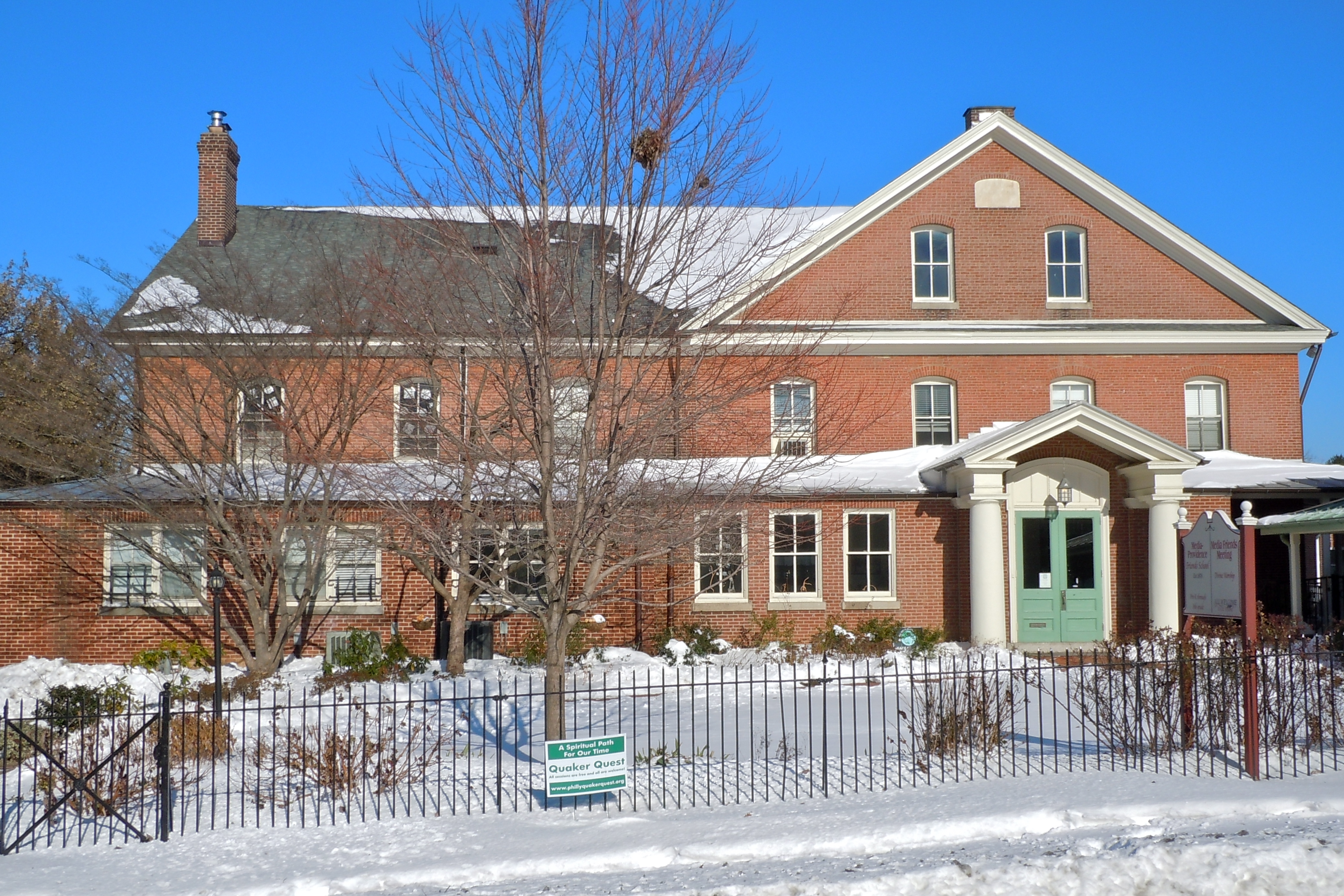
Media Friends Meeting

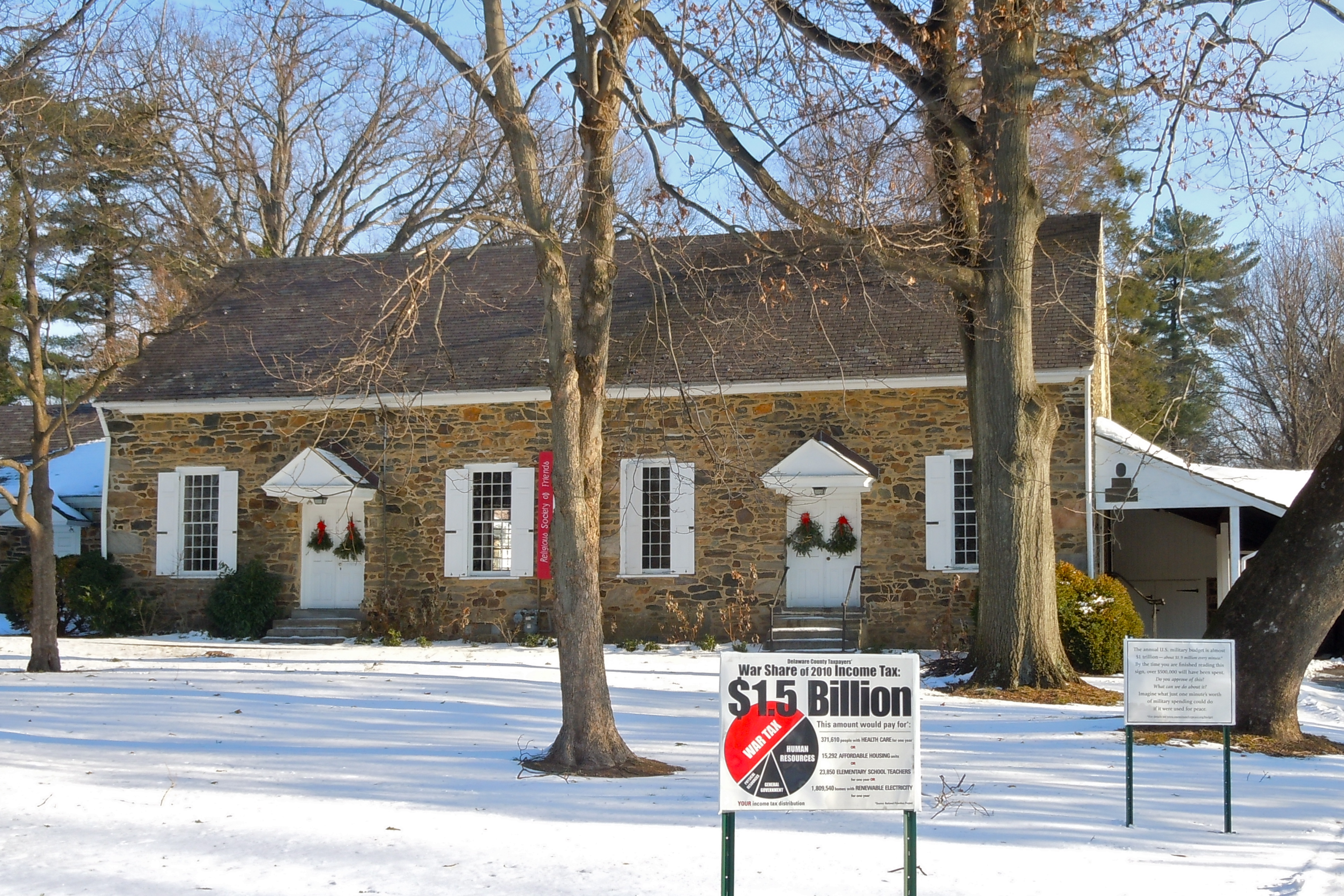
Providence Friends Meetinghouse

== Notable people ==
=== Government and politics ===
- Jesse Matlack Baker (1854–1913), Pennsylvania State Representative and State Senator
- Crosby M. Black (1866–1916), Pennsylvania State Representative and mayor of Chester, Pennsylvania
- John M. Broomall, member of the U.S. House of Representatives from Pennsylvania from 1863 to 1869
- Orson Flagg Bullard (1834–1906), Pennsylvania State Representative
- William H. G. Bullard, admiral of the U.S. Navy
- Thomas Valentine Cooper, Pennsylvania State Senator and Representative
- Edward Darlington, member of the U.S. House of Representatives from Pennsylvania from 1833 to 1839
- Graceanna Lewis, ornithologist, abolitionist, and suffragist
- Ida Saxton McKinley, First Lady of the United States from 1897 until 1901
- Joan Mondale, Second Lady of the United States from 1977 until 1981
- Mildred Scott Olmsted, peace activist and suffragist
- John Buchanan Robinson, member of the U.S. House of Representatives from Pennsylvania from 1893 to 1899
- V. Gilpin Robinson, Pennsylvania State Representative
- Anna Howard Shaw, physician and suffragist
- Bill Whitaker, journalist on CBS 60 minutes

=== Business ===
- Jonathan Bixby, costume designer
- Samuel D. Riddle, textile mill owner and race-horse owner

=== Sports ===
- Jon Conway, soccer player and coach
- Mark Donohue, racing driver, winner of the 1972 Indianapolis 500
- Harry Kalas, broadcaster for the Philadelphia Phillies
- Lew Krausse Jr., former pitcher for the Kansas City/Oakland Athletics and other teams
- Lew Krausse Sr., former pitcher for the Philadelphia Athletics
- Phil Martelli, former head basketball coach, Saint Joseph's University
- Tug McGraw, former pitcher for the New York Mets and Philadelphia Phillies
- Ted Meredith, former double Olympic gold medallist
- Auston Trusty, soccer player
- Jonah Jackson, offensive guard for the Chicago Bears

=== Entertainment ===
- John Billingsley, actor
- Jim Croce, singer and songwriter
- Ann Crumb, Broadway actress
- Paul DiMeo, actor, Extreme Makeover: Home Edition
- Dave Miller, record producer for Bill Haley's early recordings; creator of the 101 Strings franchise of Easy Listening record albums
- Todd Robinson, Emmy-winning director and screenwriter
- Dean Sabatino, drummer for The Dead Milkmen
- Wanda Sykes, actress and comedian

=== Science ===
- John Heysham Gibbon, surgeon known for inventing the heart-lung machine

=== Art ===
- Frank Furness, renowned Philadelphia architect
- Charles Lewis Fussell, 19th-century landscape painter
- Michael A. O'Donnell, author, researcher, international lecturer, and Episcopal priest

=== Military ===
- Harold J. Lavell, US Army major general

| Preceded by Chester | County seat of Delaware County; 1851–present | Succeeded by Current |
