= Dr. Samuel D. Risley House =

Historic house in Pennsylvania, United States

- U.S. National Register of Historic Places
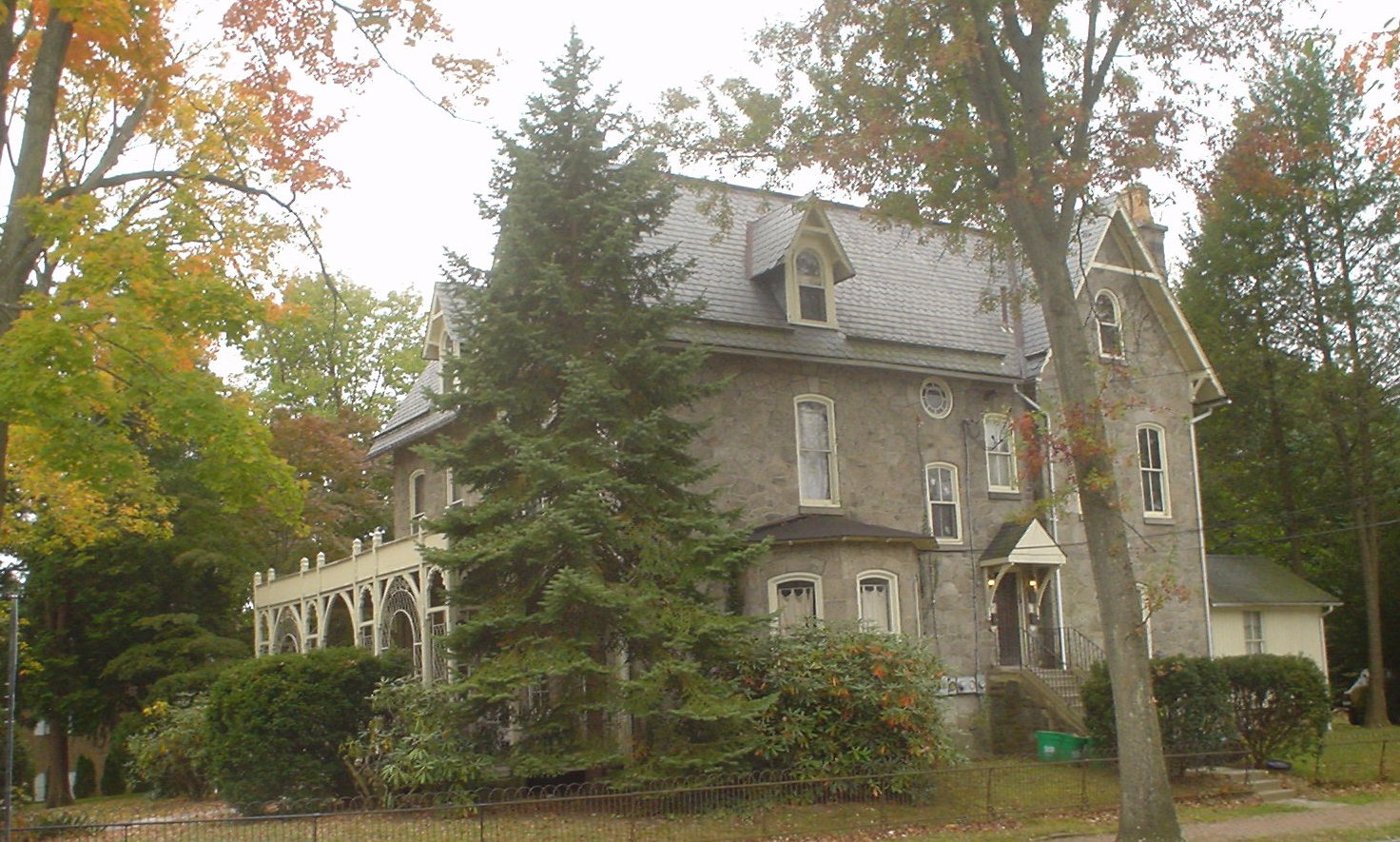
- Dr. Samuel D. Risley House, October 2009

- Location within Pennsylvania Location within the United States
- Location: 430 N. Monroe St., Media, Pennsylvania
- Coordinates: 39°55′19″N 75°23′14″W
- Area: less than one acre
- Built: 1877
- Architectural style: Gothic
- NRHP reference No.: 90000697
- Added to NRHP: April 26, 1990

The Dr. Samuel D. Risley House, also known as the Elton B. Gifford House, is a historic home located in Media, Delaware County, Pennsylvania. It was built in 1877.

It was added to the National Register of Historic Places in 1990.

== History and architectural features ==
This residence, which was built in 1877, is a 2 1/2-story, gray stone house. Designed in the Gothic Revival style, it has a slate-covered intersecting gable roof, and features a verandah and conservatory. The house was converted to apartments prior to 1967.

== Gallery ==
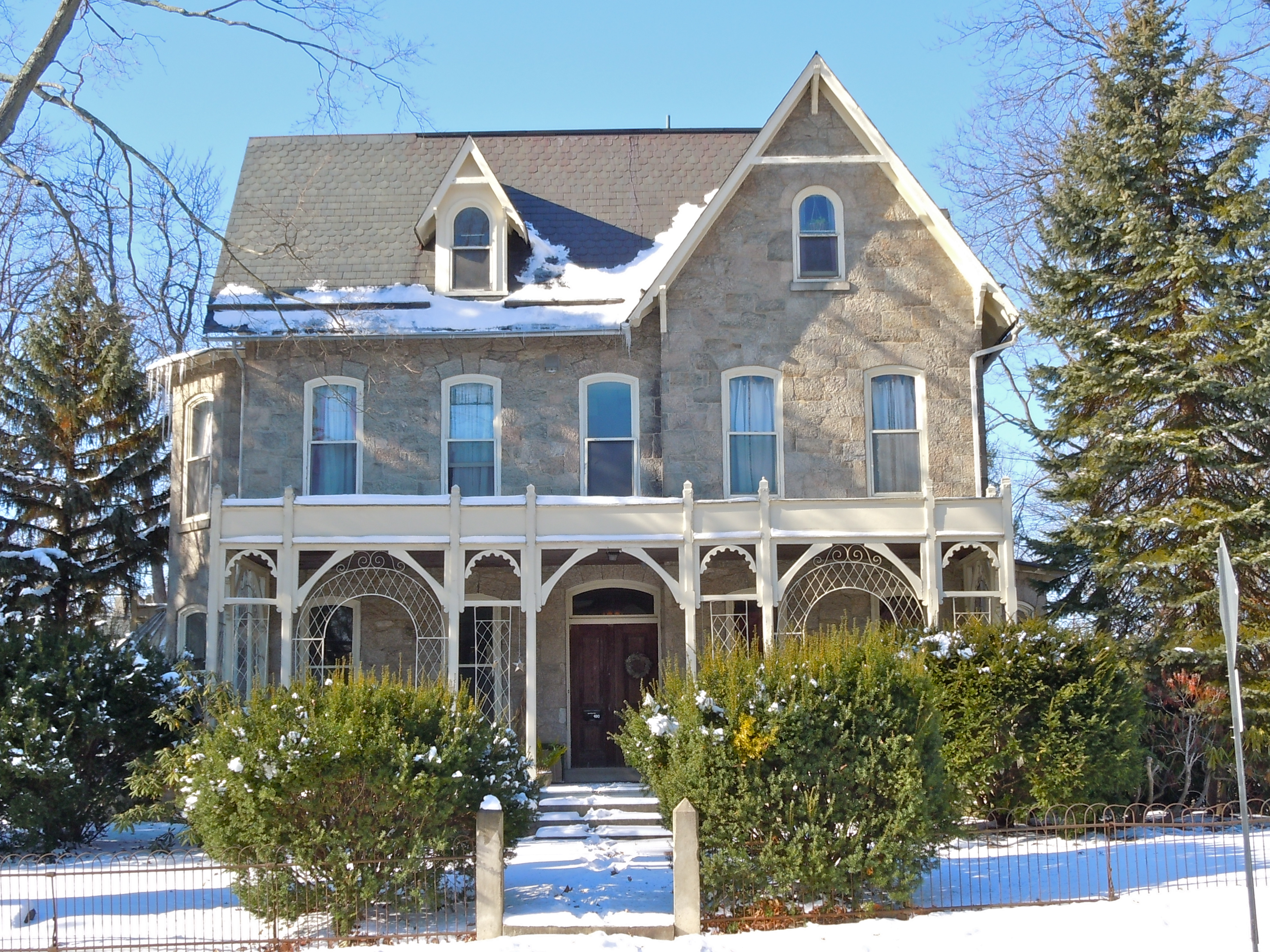
Samuel Risley House, December 2010
