= Charles Lewis Fussell =

American painter

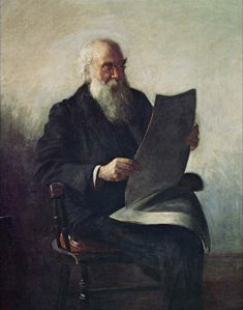
A circa 1905 portrait of Fussell by Thomas Eakins

Charles Lewis Fussell (1840–1909) was an American landscape painter in the late 19th and early 20th centuries. Fussell lived near Philadelphia for most of his life and studied at the Pennsylvania Academy of the Fine Arts with his close friend, mentor, and colleague, Thomas Eakins.

== Biography ==
=== Early life and education ===
Charles Lewis Fussell was born in West Vincent Township, Pennsylvania, in 1840 to Edwin and Rebecca (Lewis) Fussell. He was the oldest child of a large Quaker family and attended Central High School in Philadelphia, where he was classmates with Thomas Eakins and William Sartain.

Fussell later enrolled at the Pennsylvania Academy of the Fine Arts and was tutored by Peter F. Rothermel. In 1861, Eakins joined Fussell to study at the academy, where they formed a lifelong friendship. Eakins painted a portrait of Fussell in 1905.

=== Painting career ===
In an attempt to restore his father's failing health, Fussell's family moved to Townsend's Inlet, New Jersey, in 1868. At the advice of Rothermel, Fussell moved to Greeley, Colorado, in 1870 to paint the Rocky Mountains, while researching the possible climatic benefits for his father's medical condition. He soon returned to Philadelphia to study under Eakins and his family moved to Media, Pennsylvania, in 1871. Fussell traveled extensively throughout Pennsylvania, New Jersey, and New York, creating many landscape portraits.

=== Later years ===
In 1889, Fussell moved to Brooklyn to further his pursuit of landscape painting. Fussell painted scenes at Crow's Hill, Flatbush, Fort Hamilton, Sheepshead Bay, Rockaway, and other rural areas threatened by imminent urbanization.

He returned to Media, Pennsylvania, in 1897 and lived with his sister and his aunt, Graceanna Lewis, a known abolitionist, suffragist and ornithologist. Fussell continued to paint locally and gave art lessons until his death in 1909.

== Painting gallery ==
Fussell worked in many different mediums including oil paints, watercolors and pen & pencil. From 1863 to 1905, Fussell exhibited 38 paintings at the Pennsylvania Academy of the Fine Arts. His exhibits consisted primarily of landscape paintings, but his early work also included genre subject and still life pieces.

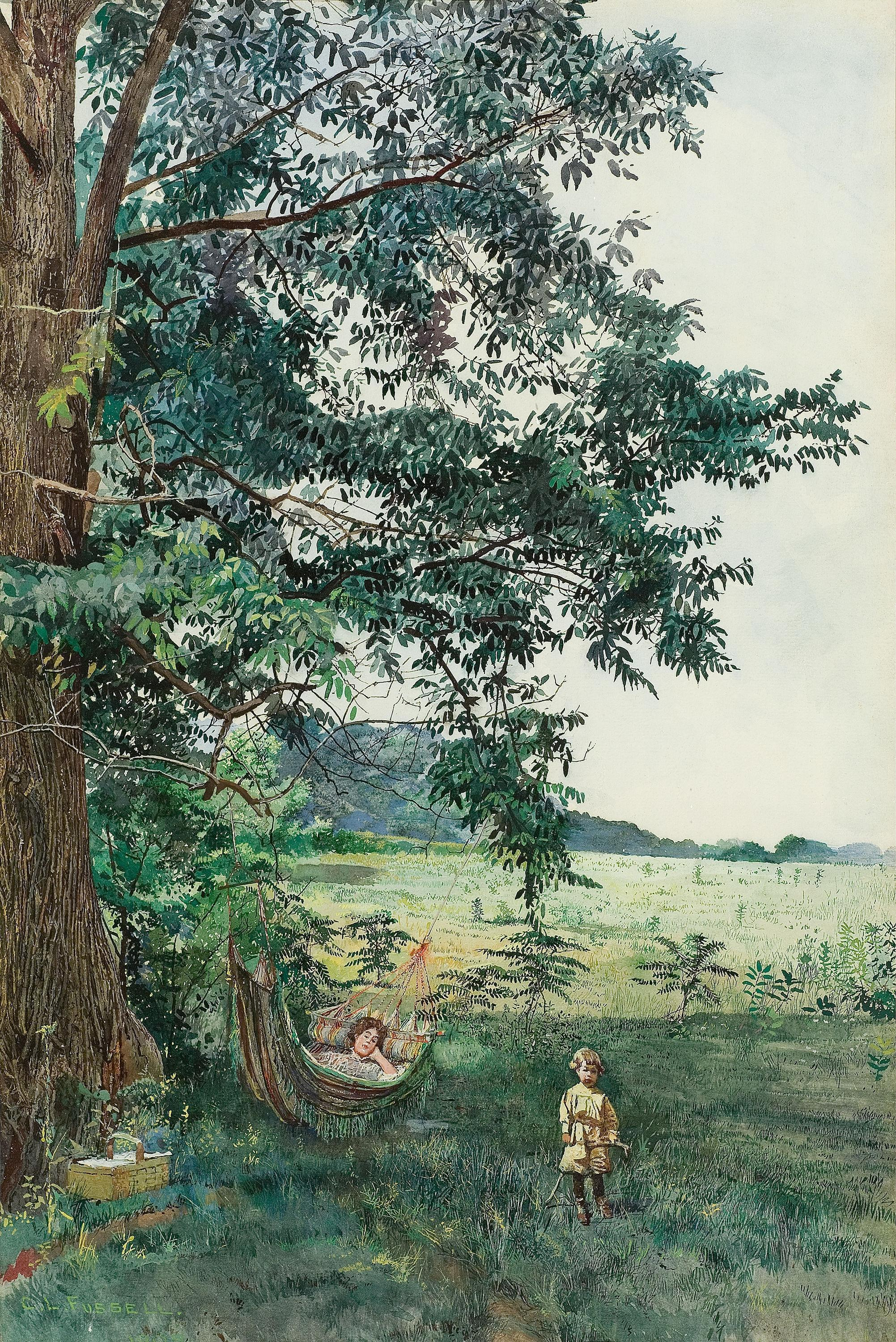
Summer afternoon

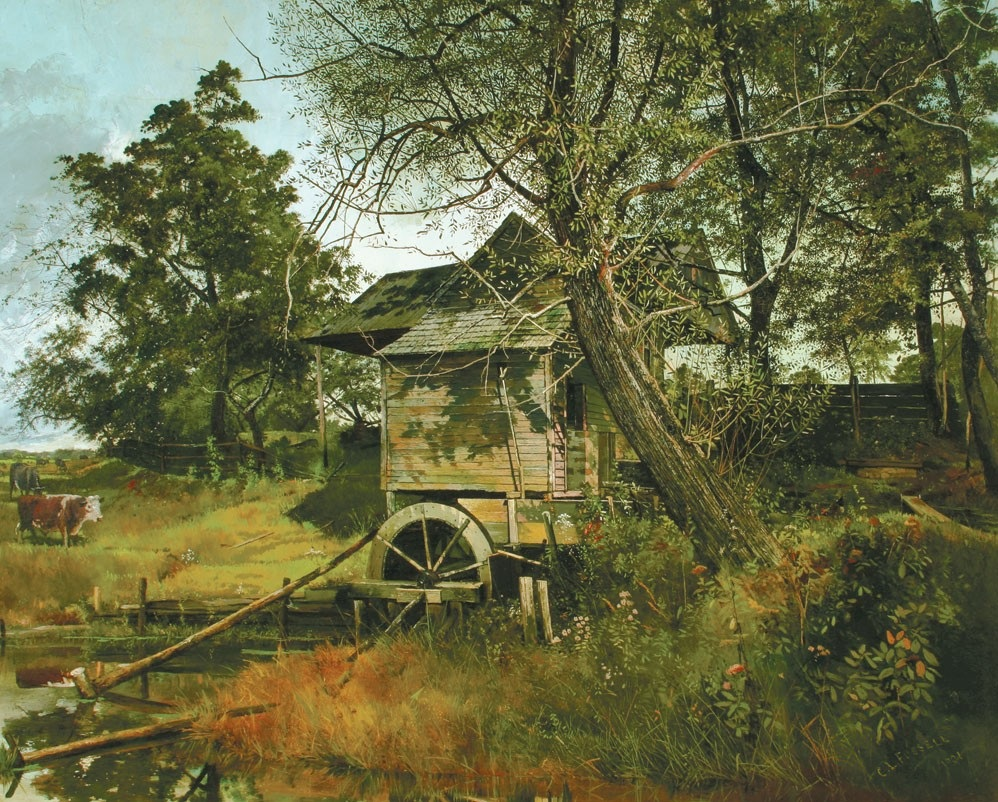
The Old Mill (1901)

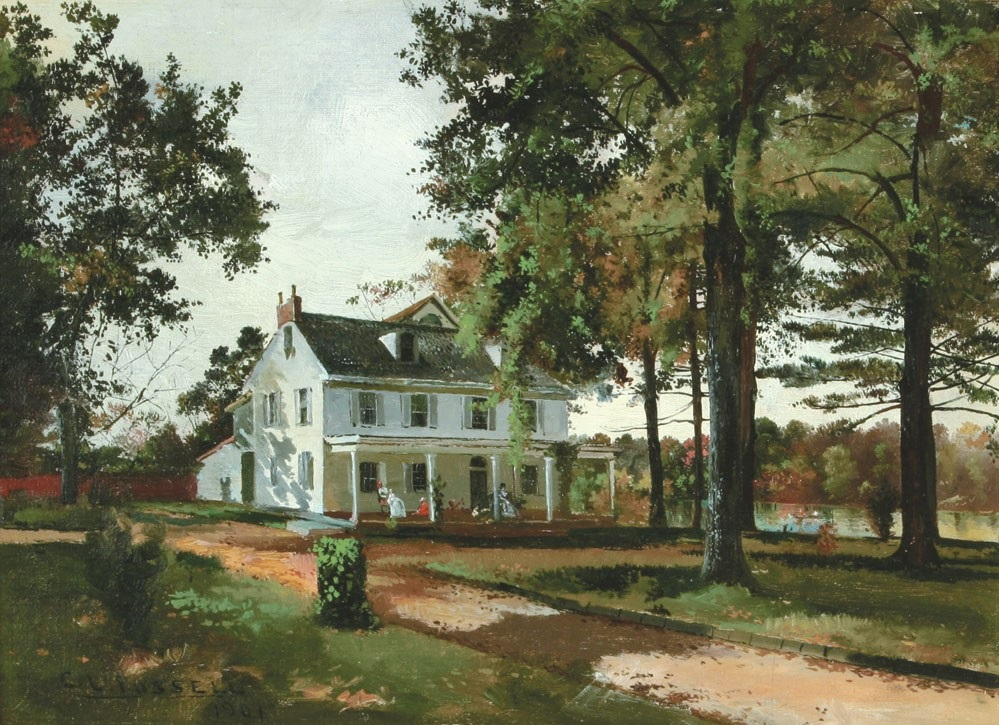
The Evans Homestead Haddonfield New Jersey (1901)

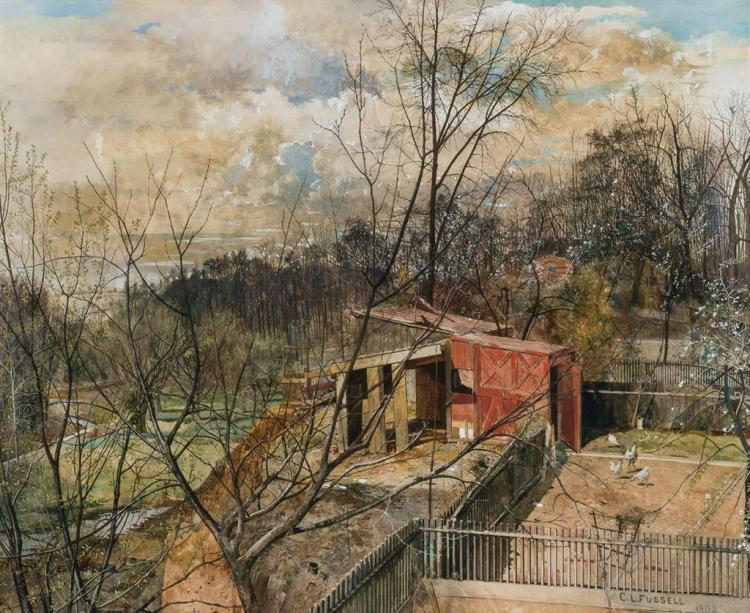
Spring blossoms (1902)
