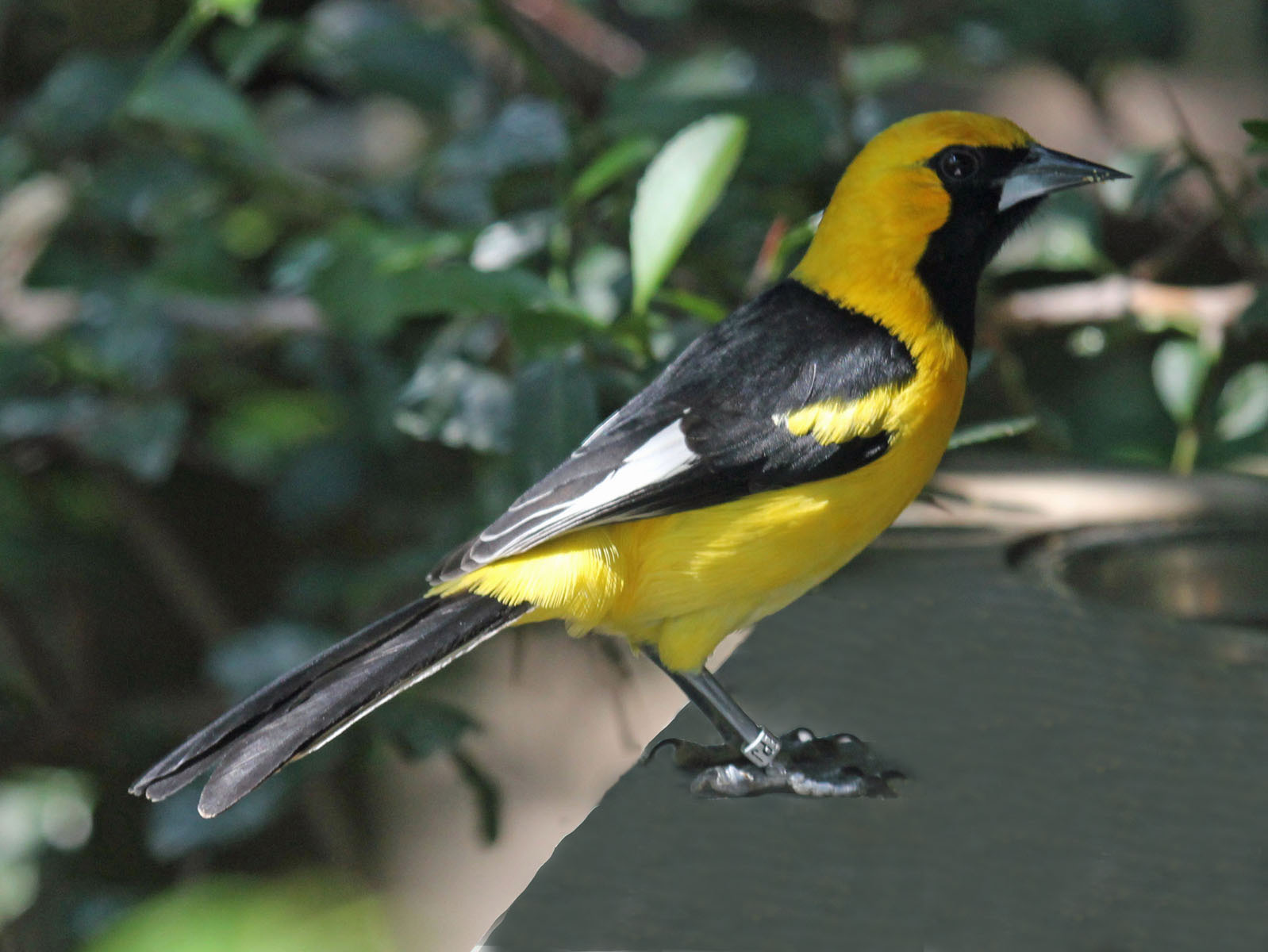
- A captive white-edged oriole in the Birds of Eden aviary, South Africa

Conservation status
- Least Concern (IUCN 3.1)

Scientific classification
- Kingdom: Animalia
- Phylum: Chordata
- Class: Aves
- Order: Passeriformes
- Family: Icteridae
- Genus: Icterus
- Species: I. graceannae

Binomial name
- Icterus graceannae Cassin, 1867

= White-edged oriole =

Species of bird

The white-edged oriole (Icterus graceannae) is a species of bird in the family Icteridae, the oropendolas, New World orioles, and New World blackbirds. It is found in Ecuador and Peru.

== Taxonomy and systematics ==
The white-edged oriole was formally described by John Cassin in 1867 with the binomial Icterus Grace-Annae, which (with modern spelling) remains its binomial. Cassin named it "in honor of my highly esteemed friend, Miss Grace Anna Lewis...accomplished as a teacher of Natural History".

The white-edged oriole is monotypic.

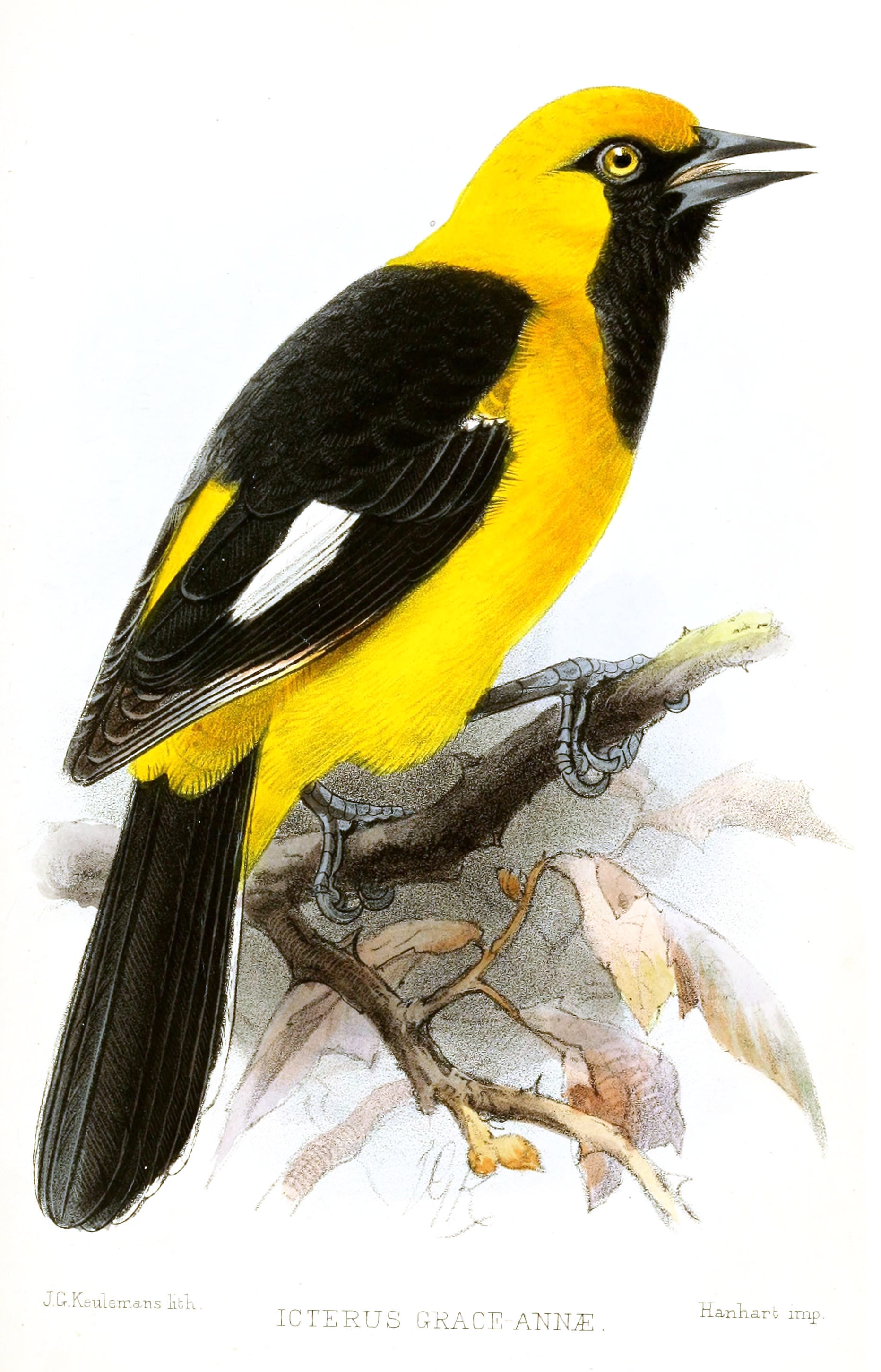
Illustration by John Gerrard Keulemans, 1883

== Description ==
The white-edged oriole is 19 to 20 cm (7.5 to 7.9 in) long. Males weigh an average of about 46 g (1.6 oz) and females about 37 g (1.3 oz). The sexes have the same plumage. Adults are mostly orange-yellow. They have black lores, a black "mask", and a black "bib" from the chin to the upper breast. Their back is black. Their wings are mostly black with pale yellow lesser and median coverts. Their innermost secondaries and their tertials have the eponymous wide white edges at their bases that show as a large white patch on the closed wing. Their tail is mostly black with white edges on the outermost pair of feathers and sometimes white tips on the next three pairs inward. They have a dark brown iris, a black bill with a gray base to the mandible, and grayish blue legs and feet. Juveniles are duller and greener than adults, with olive tips on the back feathers, dull blackish coverts with yellow tips, and much less white on the flight feathers.

== Distribution and habitat ==
The white-edged oriole is found in a somewhat narrow band along the Pacific coast from central Manabí Province in west-central Ecuador south into northwestern Peru's La Libertad Department. It primarily inhabits dry deciduous forest and arid scrublands but in far southern Ecuador also is found in the adjoining subtropical zone. In Ecuador it is found mostly below 400 m (1,300 ft) and in Peru is found locally as high as 1,800 m (5,900 ft).

== Behavior ==
=== Movement ===
The white-edged oriole is believed to be a year-round resident.

=== Feeding ===
The white-edged oriole's diet has not been studied but is assumed to be arthropods, fruit, and nectar. It usually forages in pairs or family groups.

=== Breeding ===
The white-edged oriole's breeding season has not been fully defined but includes at least February and March in Ecuador and possibly extends to May in Peru. It is a monogamous solitary breeder. Its nest is a bag made from plant fibers hanging by its rim, typically from a branch fork. Two nests in Ecuador were 1.8 and 4 m (6 and 13 ft) above the ground. The clutch is two or three eggs that are cream-colored with dark brown markings. Both parents provision nestlings. The incubation period, time to fledging, and other details of parental care are not known. The shiny cowbird (Molothrus bonariensis) is a brood parasite.

=== Vocalization ===
The white-edged oriole's song is a "series of rich musical phrases...e.g. chiro-chowee...weeeenh-weh...chiro-chowee...piro, chiro-chowee...weeeenh-weh...piro, chiro-chowee". Its call is "a distinctive throaty jori-jori" that is usually doubled.

== Status ==
The IUCN has assessed the white-edged oriole as being of Least Concern. It has a large range; its population size is not known but is believed to be stable. No immediate threats have been identified. It "[s]eems to be relatively numerous and tolerant of moderate disturbances".
