= Providence Friends Meetinghouse =

Coordinates: 39.9184°N 75.3811°W

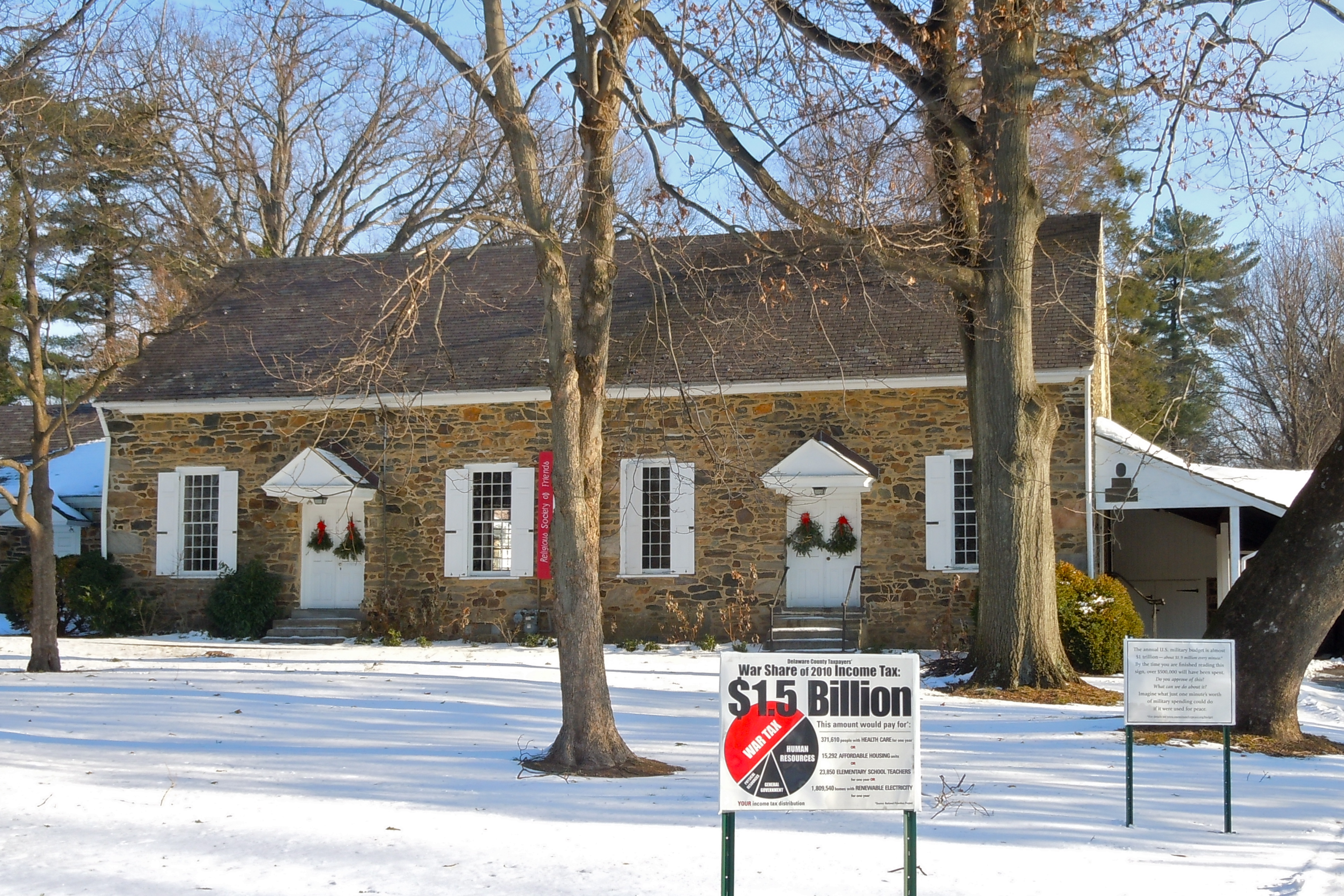
Providence Friends Meetinghouse in December 2010

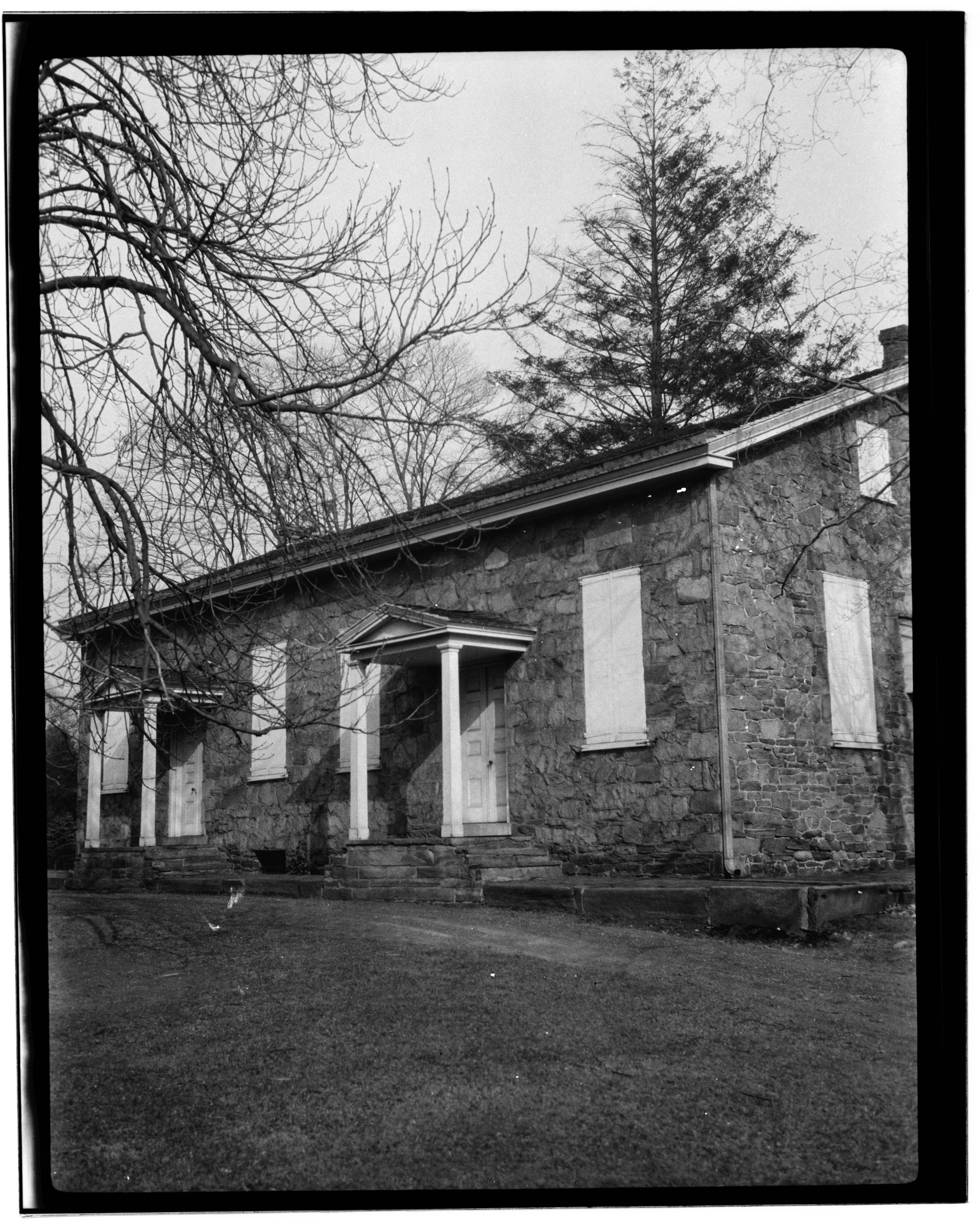
Providence Friends Meetinghouse in 1926

Providence Friends Meetinghouse is a Historic Quaker meeting house at 105 North Providence Road in Media, Pennsylvania. It is still an active worship center.

== History ==
The first mention of the Providence Friends meeting was in 1696 when it was recorded that a meeting will be held "At Thomas Minshall's every First and Fourth day." The meeting was moved from Thomas Minshall's house in 1700 to a log building which was replaced by a stone structure in 1727.

In 1753, the previous stone structure was removed and replaced with a larger stone building that stands today.

John Martin Broomall, the U.S. Congressman from Pennsylvania's 7th congressional district was known to attend the Providence Friends Meetinghouse and spoke there several times.

The Providence Friends Meetinghouse continues to be an active worship center.
