= Orson Flagg Bullard =

American politician (1834-1906)

Pennsylvania House of Representatives, Delaware County
- In office 1873–1874
- Preceded by: Thomas Valentine Cooper
- Succeeded by: William Cooper Talley

Pennsylvania House of Representatives, Delaware County
- In office 1877–1878
- Preceded by: William Cooper Talley
- Succeeded by: Young Singleton Walter

Personal details
- Born: June 18, 1834 Bridgewater Township, Pennsylvania, U.S.
- Died: July 19, 1906 (aged 72) Hackensack, New Jersey, U.S.
- Resting place: Media Cemetery, Upper Providence Township, Delaware County, Pennsylvania, U.S.
- Party: Republican

Orson Flagg Bullard (June 18, 1834 - July 19, 1906) was an American politician from Pennsylvania who served as a Republican member of the Pennsylvania House of Representatives for Delaware County from 1873 to 1875 and from 1877 to 1878. He was expelled from the Pennsylvania House of Representatives for embezzlement and escaping the custody of the sergeant-at-arms of the House.

== Early life and education ==
Bullard was born in Bridgewater Township, Pennsylvania, he attended public schools and completed his education at the academy at Montrose.

In 1863, Bullard enlisted in Company C of the 29th Pennsylvania Volunteer Infantry and served as a sergeant. He participated in several skirmishes around the Battle of Gettysburg during the American Civil War.

In 1855, Bullard began studying law under John Martin Broomall. He also worked as a principal of a boys' grammar school in Chester, Pennsylvania, but quit after one year to study law full time. In 1859, he was admitted to the Delaware County bar and in 1874 to the Philadelphia bar and to practice in the Pennsylvania Supreme Court.

== Career ==
He served as clerk for the office of the Prothonotary, Delaware County from 1862 to 1865 and was elected Prothonotary and Clerk of Courts for Delaware County from 1866-1871. Bullard was also elected school director for Media, Pennsylvania and served for 2 years.

Bullard was elected to the Pennsylvania House of Representatives for Delaware County for the 1873, 1877 and 1878 terms. He was not a candidate for reelection to the House for the 1874 term.

Bullard was charged with embezzlement of funds from the Media Gas Company where he served as secretary. He was expelled from the House on March 7, 1878 for embezzlement and escaping the custody of the sergeant-at-arms of the House.

== Personal life ==
In 1859, Bullard married Rebecca A. Huston and together they had nine children. Their son, William H.G. Bullard was an admiral in the United States Navy who served in the Spanish American War and World War I.

He was a member of the Beradburg Post No. 149, Grand Army of the Republic in Media, Pennsylvania.

Bullard died in Hackensack, New Jersey and is interred at the Media Cemetery in Upper Providence Township, Delaware County, Pennsylvania.

Pennsylvania House of Representatives
Preceded by Thomas Valentine Cooper	Member of the Pennsylvania House of Representatives, Delaware County; 1873–1874	Succeeded by William Cooper Talley
Preceded by William P. Worrall	Member of the Pennsylvania House of Representatives, Delaware County; 1877–1878	Succeeded by Young Singleton Walter
