= Bridgewater Township, Pennsylvania =

Township in Pennsylvania, United States

- Township
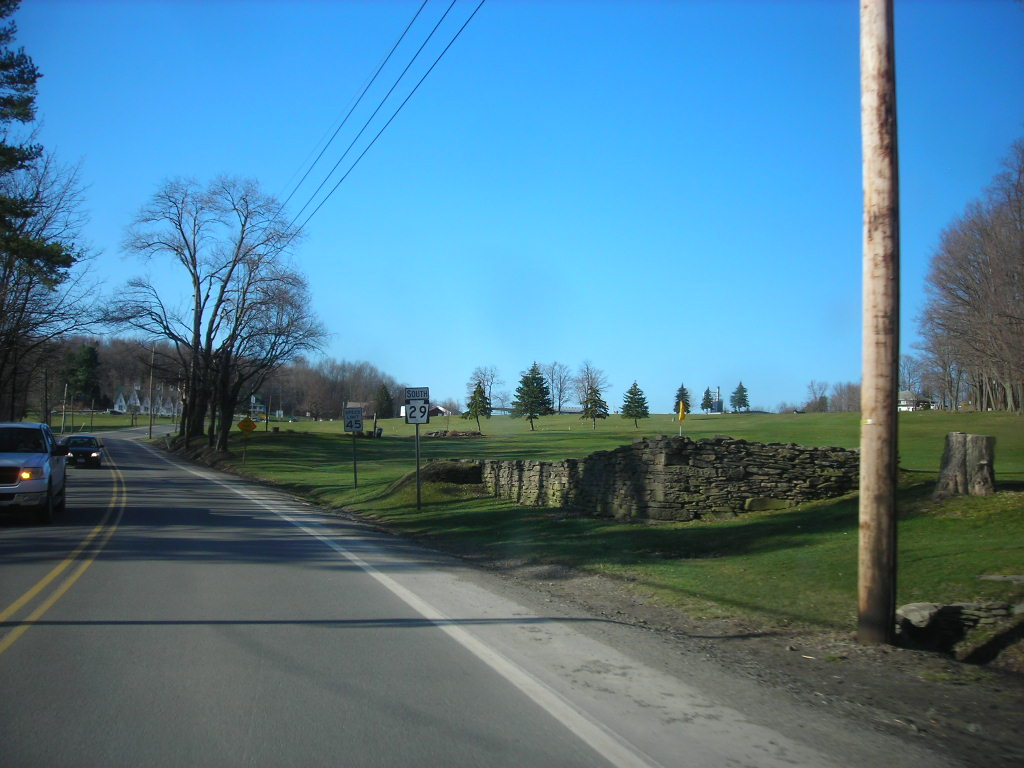
- PA 29 in Bridgewater Township

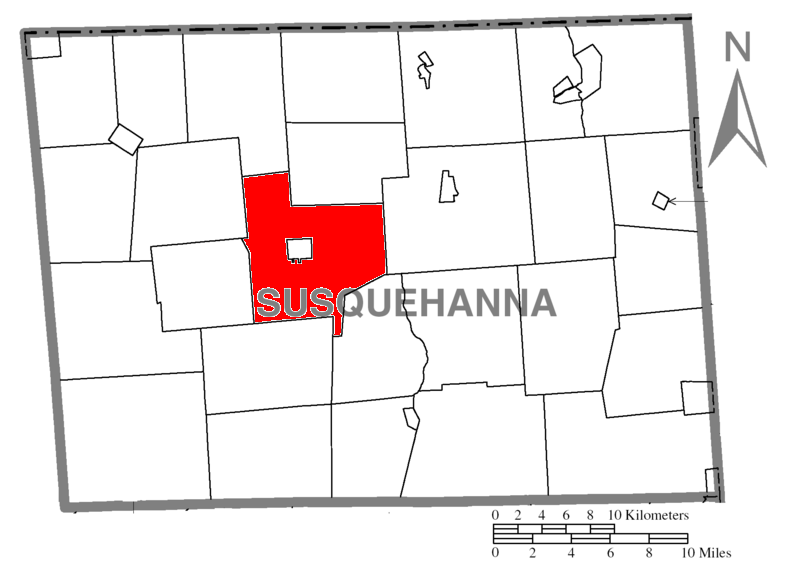

- Location of Pennsylvania in the United States
- Coordinates: 41°50′00″N 75°49′59″W
- Country: United States
- State: Pennsylvania
- County: Susquehanna
- Settled: 1798
- Incorporated: 1806

Area
  - Total: 41.40 sq mi (107.22 km^{2})
  - Land: 41.03 sq mi (106.28 km^{2})
  - Water: 0.36 sq mi (0.94 km^{2})

Population (2020)
  - Total: 2,582 ▼
  - Estimate (2021): 2,579
  - Density: 67.1/sq mi (25.91/km^{2})
- Time zone: UTC-5 (EST)
  - Summer (DST): UTC-4 (EDT)
- Area code: 570
- FIPS code: 42-115-08648
- Website: www.bridgewatertwp.us

Bridgewater Township is a township in Susquehanna County, Pennsylvania, United States. The population was 2,582 at the 2020 census, but is now estimated to be 2,754.

== History ==
Bridgewater Township was formed in November 1806 from parts of Tunkhannock, Braintrim, Nicholson, and Rush Townships in what was then northern Luzerne County. The Borough of Montrose was incorporated from part of Bridgewater Township in 1824.

== Geography ==
According to the United States Census Bureau, the township has a total area of 41.41 square miles (107.3 km^{2}), of which 41.05 square miles (106.3 km^{2}) is land and 0.36 square miles (0.93 km^{2}) (0.82%) is water.

== Demographics ==
Historical population
| Census | Pop. | Note | %± |
|---|---|---|---|
| 2010 | 2,844 | | — |
| 2020 | 2,582 | | −9.2% |
| 2021 (est.) | 2,579 | | −0.1% |
U.S. Decennial Census

As of the census of 2010, there were 2,844 people, 1,124 households, and 766 families residing in the township. The population density was 69.3 people per square mile (26.8 people/km^{2}). There were 1,303 housing units at an average density of 31.7 per square mile (12.2/km^{2}). The racial makeup of the township was 98.1% White, 0.4% African American, 0.2% Native American, 0.4% Asian, 0.1% from other races, and 0.8% from two or more races. Hispanic or Latino of any race were 1% of the population.

There were 1,124 households, out of which 28.8% had children under the age of 18 living with them, 55.2% were married couples living together, 8.2% had a female householder with no husband present, and 31.9% were non-families. 26.5% of all households were made up of individuals, and 12.5% had someone living alone who was 65 years of age or older. The average household size was 2.43 and the average family size was 2.92.

In the township the population was spread out, with 20.9% under the age of 18, 59.8% from 18 to 64, and 19.3% who were 65 years of age or older. The median age was 45.7 years.

The median income for a household in the township was $44,188, and the median income for a family was $59,079. Males had a median income of $32,853 versus $26,056 for females. The per capita income for the township was $24,898. About 4.2% of families and 8.3% of the population were below the poverty line, including 9.2% of those under age 18 and 1.4% of those age 65 or over.

== Notable people ==
- Orson Flagg Bullard - Pennsylvania State Representative
