= Robert Chadwick (politician) =

American politician (1833–1902)

Robert M. Chadwick
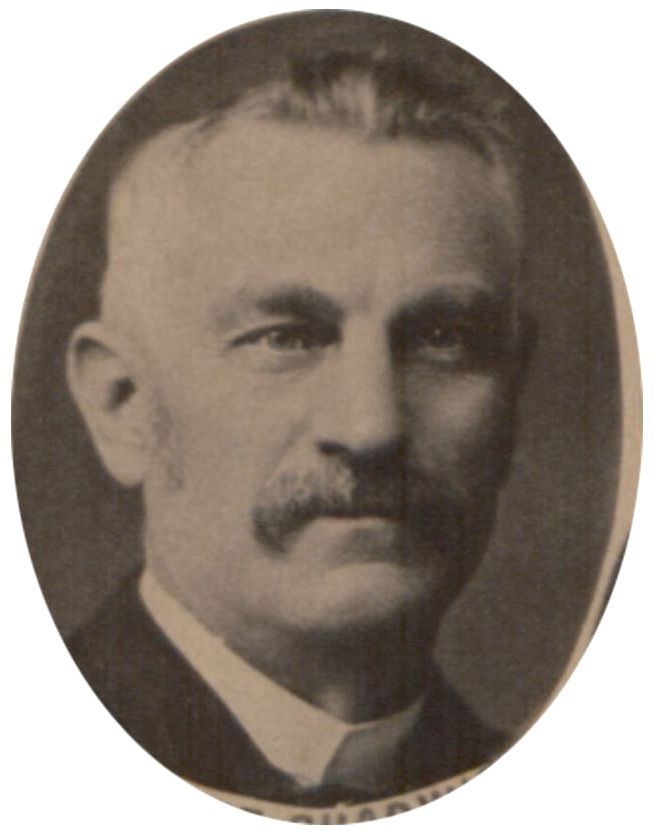
- Chadwick, c.1885

Member of the Pennsylvania House of Representatives from the Delaware County district
- In office 1881–1888
- Preceded by: Young Singleton Walter

Personal details
- Born: November 23, 1833 Rochdale, England
- Died: April 21, 1902 (aged 68) Chester, Pennsylvania, U.S.
- Resting place: Chester Rural Cemetery
- Party: Republican

Robert M. Chadwick (November 23, 1833 – April 21, 1902) was an English-born American wheelwright, wagon manufacturer and politician who served as a Republican member of the Pennsylvania House of Representatives for Delaware County from 1881 to 1888. A veteran of the American Civil War, he also sat on the Chester City Council and was postmaster of Chester from 1889 to 1894.

== Early life ==
Chadwick was born in Rochdale, Lancashire, England, on November 23, 1833, (Note: The official biography published by the Pennsylvania House of Representatives gives his birth year as 1834. His obituary in the Chester Times gives November 23, 1833.) the son of Thomas and Sarah (née Crabtree) Chadwick. The family emigrated to the United States in 1847 and settled in Upland, Pennsylvania. In August 1852 he lost both parents within days of each other: his mother died on August 8, and eight days later his father drowned in Chester Creek.

Chadwick attended the public schools of Upland until he was 17 and then moved to Frankford, where he learned the wheelwright trade.

== Civil War service ==
On August 5, 1862, Chadwick was mustered into the Union Army as a private in Company I of the 114th Pennsylvania Infantry Regiment, a Zouave regiment raised in Philadelphia by Charles H. T. Collis and known as the Collis Zouaves. During his service the regiment fought at Fredericksburg, Chancellorsville and Gettysburg. He served for the remainder of the war and was mustered out with his company on May 29, 1865, receiving his discharge at Arlington, Virginia.

== Business and political career ==
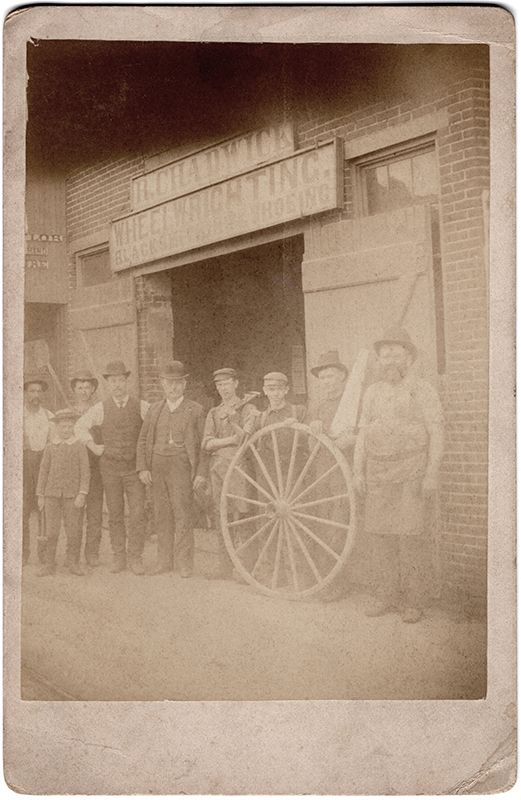
Chadwick's wheelwright and blacksmith shop at Third and Fulton Streets, Chester, c.1885

In 1866 Chadwick moved with his family to Chester, Pennsylvania, where he opened a wagon factory and blacksmith shop at the corner of Third and Fulton Streets. He ran the business for the rest of his life and was still visiting the shop daily in his final weeks.

A lifelong Republican, Chadwick was elected to the Chester City Council from the city's South Ward in 1877 and re-elected in 1880, serving from 1877 to 1882. In 1880 he was elected to the Pennsylvania House of Representatives for Delaware County; he was re-elected in 1882, 1884 and 1886, serving four consecutive terms from 1881 to 1888, and did not seek re-election in 1888. His obituary in the Chester Times described him as a legislator who seldom made formal speeches on the floor of the House but who was well regarded by colleagues of both parties and was able to gather support for the measures he backed.

Chadwick served for two years on the board of trustees of the Soldiers' Home at Erie, Pennsylvania. In 1889, President Benjamin Harrison appointed him postmaster of Chester, an office he held until 1894, when he was succeeded by John L. Garrett.

== Personal life ==
Louisa Jane Gardner Chadwick c.1929

On September 9, 1857, Chadwick married Louisa J. Gardner, the daughter of Henry G. Gardner of Frankford, in Frankford. The couple had six children, four of whom survived him: Henry G. Chadwick, a coal dealer; John G. Chadwick, a physician; Susie A. Worrell; and Sarah Louise Kirk. Louisa Chadwick, who was born in Jersey City, New Jersey, on January 8, 1837, outlived her husband by 35 years. When she turned 100 in January 1937, the Chester Times reported that she was believed to be the oldest woman in Chester; she died on April 1, 1937. She was a longtime member of Chester's First Baptist Church, and at her hundredth birthday had eight grandchildren, twelve great-grandchildren and one great-great-grandchild.

Chadwick was a member of Wilde Post No. 25 of the Grand Army of the Republic and of the Union Veteran Legion. He was a Freemason, a past master of Chester Lodge No. 236, Free and Accepted Masons, and a member of Chester Chapter No. 258 of the Royal Arch Masons and of St. John Commandery No. 4 of the Knights Templar in Philadelphia. He also belonged to the Odd Fellows.

== Death ==
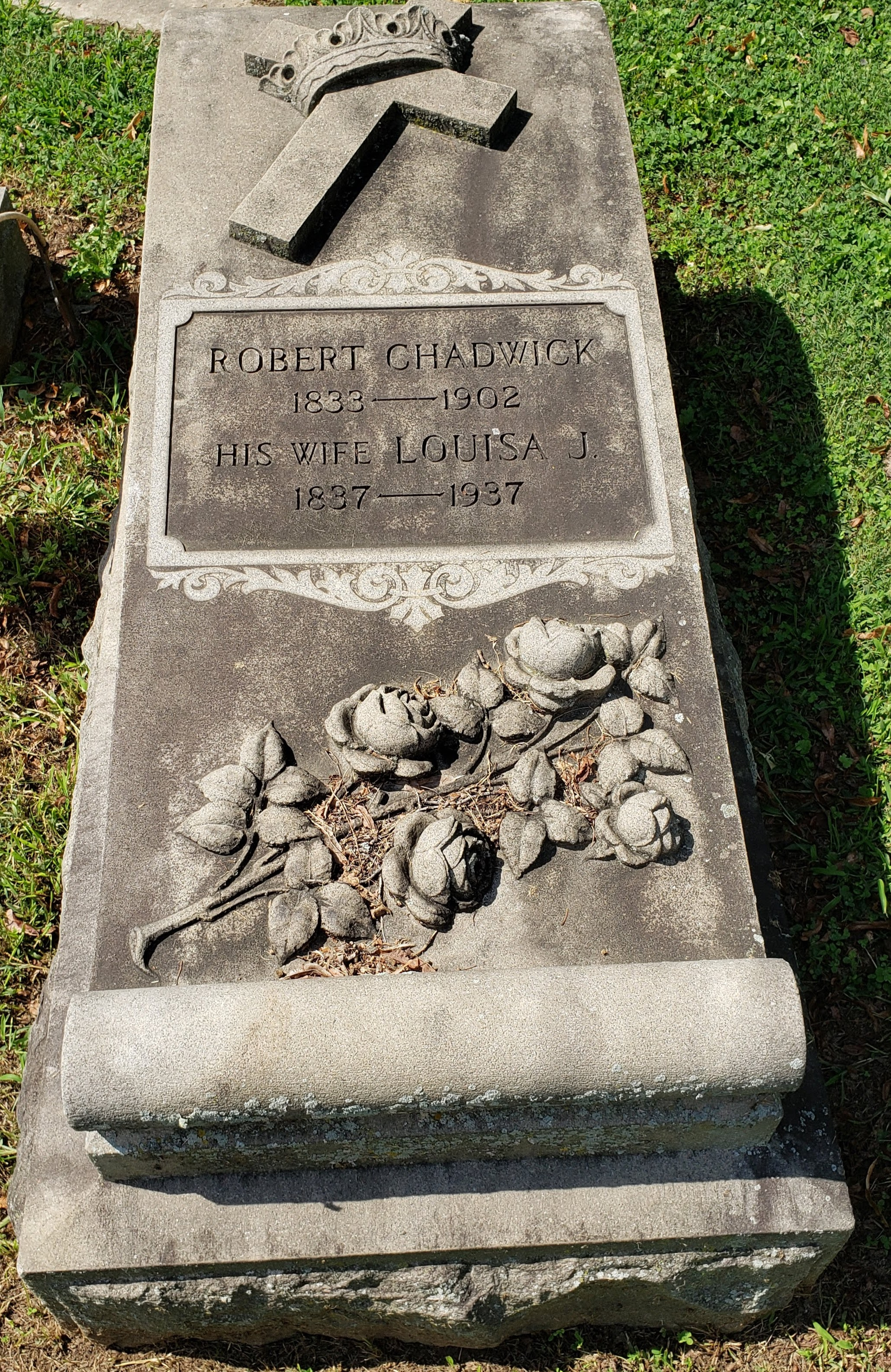
Chadwick's grave in Chester Rural Cemetery

Chadwick's health declined after a severe illness several months before his death, and he subsequently developed Bright's disease. On the morning of April 21, 1902, he went to his shop as usual, returned to his home at 220 West Seventh Street, and died there shortly after noon. His funeral was held at his home on April 24, with the service conducted by the pastor of Chester's First Baptist Church, and he was buried in Chester Rural Cemetery with Masonic rites. Surviving members of his Civil War regiment, members of Wilde Post, former colleagues from the city council, the legislature and the post office, and the Chester letter carriers attended. Also among the mourners were several men who had served their apprenticeships in his shop. He was the first postmaster of Chester to die since the city's incorporation in 1866.
