= Thomas Valentine Cooper =

American politician (1835–1909)

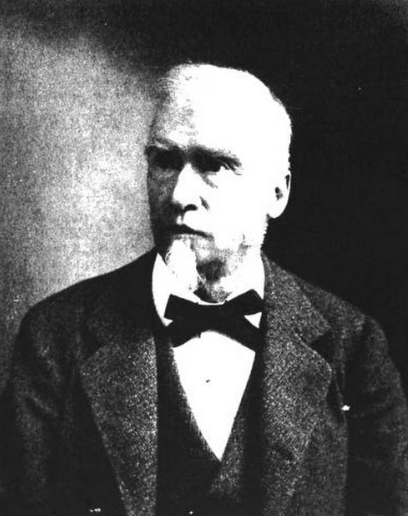

Pennsylvania House of Representatives, Delaware County
- In office 1870–1871
- Preceded by: Augustus B. Leedom
- Succeeded by: Tyron Lewis

Pennsylvania House of Representatives, Delaware County
- In office 1872–1873
- Preceded by: Tyron Lewis
- Succeeded by: Orson Flagg Bullard

Pennsylvania State Senate, 5th district
- In office 1873–1874
- Preceded by: William B. Waddell
- Succeeded by: John Edgar Reyburn

Pennsylvania State Senate, 9th district
- In office 1875–1888
- Preceded by: William M. Randall
- Succeeded by: John Buchanan Robinson

Pennsylvania House of Representatives, Delaware County
- In office 1901–1909
- Preceded by: Thomas Henry Garvin
- Succeeded by: William D. Jones Jr.

Personal details
- Born: January 16, 1835 Cadiz, Ohio, U.S.
- Died: December 19, 1909 (aged 74) Media, Pennsylvania, U.S.
- Resting place: Media Cemetery, Upper Providence Township, Pennsylvania, U.S.
- Party: Republican
- Spouse: Ada F. Cooper

Military service
- Allegiance: United States
- Branch/service: Union Army
- Years of service: 1861–1864
- Rank: 1st lieutenant
- Commands: 26th Pennsylvania Infantry
- Battles/wars: American Civil War; Battle of Second Bull Run; Battle of Chancellorsville; Battle of Fredericksburg; Battle of Gettysburg; Battle of the Wilderness; Battle of Spotsylvania Court House

Thomas Valentine Cooper (January 16, 1835 - December 19, 1909) was an American politician from Pennsylvania who served as a Republican member of the Pennsylvania House of Representatives for Delaware County for the 1870 and 1872 terms. Cooper served as a member of the Pennsylvania State Senate for district 5 from 1873 to 1874 and for district 9 from 1875 to 1889. He was reelected to the Pennsylvania House of Representatives in 1901 and served until his death in 1909.

Cooper served as a private and an officer in the Union Army during the American Civil War, was a newspaper editor of the Delaware County American newspaper for 54 years and an author of books on political and civil war history.

== Early life and military service ==
Cooper was born in Cadiz, Ohio, to Dr. J.W. and Henrietta (Fields) Cooper.

From 1861 to 1864, Cooper served in the Union Army during the Civil War for three years as a private in Company C, 26th Pennsylvania Infantry and for three months as first lieutenant in the 4th Pennsylvania Reserve Regiment. He served in 13 engagements during the war including Second Bull Run, Chancellorsville, Fredericksburg, Gettysburg, the Wilderness and Spotsylvania Court House.

== Career ==
In 1855, Cooper founded the Media Advertiser newspaper. In 1856, the name was changed to the Media Advertiser and Delaware County American and again in 1859 to the Delaware County American.

Cooper served as a delegate to the 1860 Republican National Convention in Chicago, Illinois and had a pivotal role in the nomination of Abraham Lincoln.

In 1865, Cooper received an appointment from the Secretary of War, Edwin Stanton, as director of government printing. He became the publisher of the Soldier's Journal but turned down a permanent appointment as director of the Bureau of Military Printing.

In 1869, Cooper was elected to the Pennsylvania House of Representatives for Delaware County and was defeated in 1871 and reelected in 1872. The following year, Cooper was elected to the Pennsylvania Senate and was reelected continuously until 1889. In 1878, he was president of the Senate.

In 1889, Cooper was appointed by President Benjamin Harrison as collector of the port of Philadelphia, and in 1900, he was elected again to the Pennsylvania House of Representatives for Delaware County and served until his death in 1909.

== Personal life ==
In 1858, Cooper married Ada F. Turner and together they had six children.

Cooper was a member of the George W. Bartram Lodge, Free and Accepted Masons and of the Bradbury Post, Grand Army of the Republic.

Cooper died in his home in a fire started by his own cigar and was interred at Media Cemetery in Upper Providence Township, Pennsylvania.

== Bibliography ==
- American politics (non-partisan) From the Beginning to Date, Fireside Publishing Company, 1892
- Campaign of '84, Baird & Dillon, 1884
- Pennsylvania's Memorial Days, September 11 and 12, 1889: The 26th Pennsylvania Volunteers, Self-published, 1889

Pennsylvania House of Representatives
Preceded by Augustus B. Leedom	Member of the Pennsylvania House of Representatives, Delaware County; 1870–1871	Succeeded by Tyron Lewis
Preceded by Tyron Lewis	Member of the Pennsylvania House of Representatives, Delaware County; 1872–1873	Succeeded by Orson Flagg Bullard
Pennsylvania State Senate
Preceded by	Member of the Pennsylvania Senate; 1874-1889	Succeeded by
Pennsylvania House of Representatives
Preceded by	Member of the Pennsylvania House of Representatives, Delaware County; 1901–1909	Succeeded by
