= 1st Pennsylvania Reserve Regiment =

Union Army infantry regiment

1st Pennsylvania Reserve Regiment (30th Pennsylvania Volunteer Infantry)
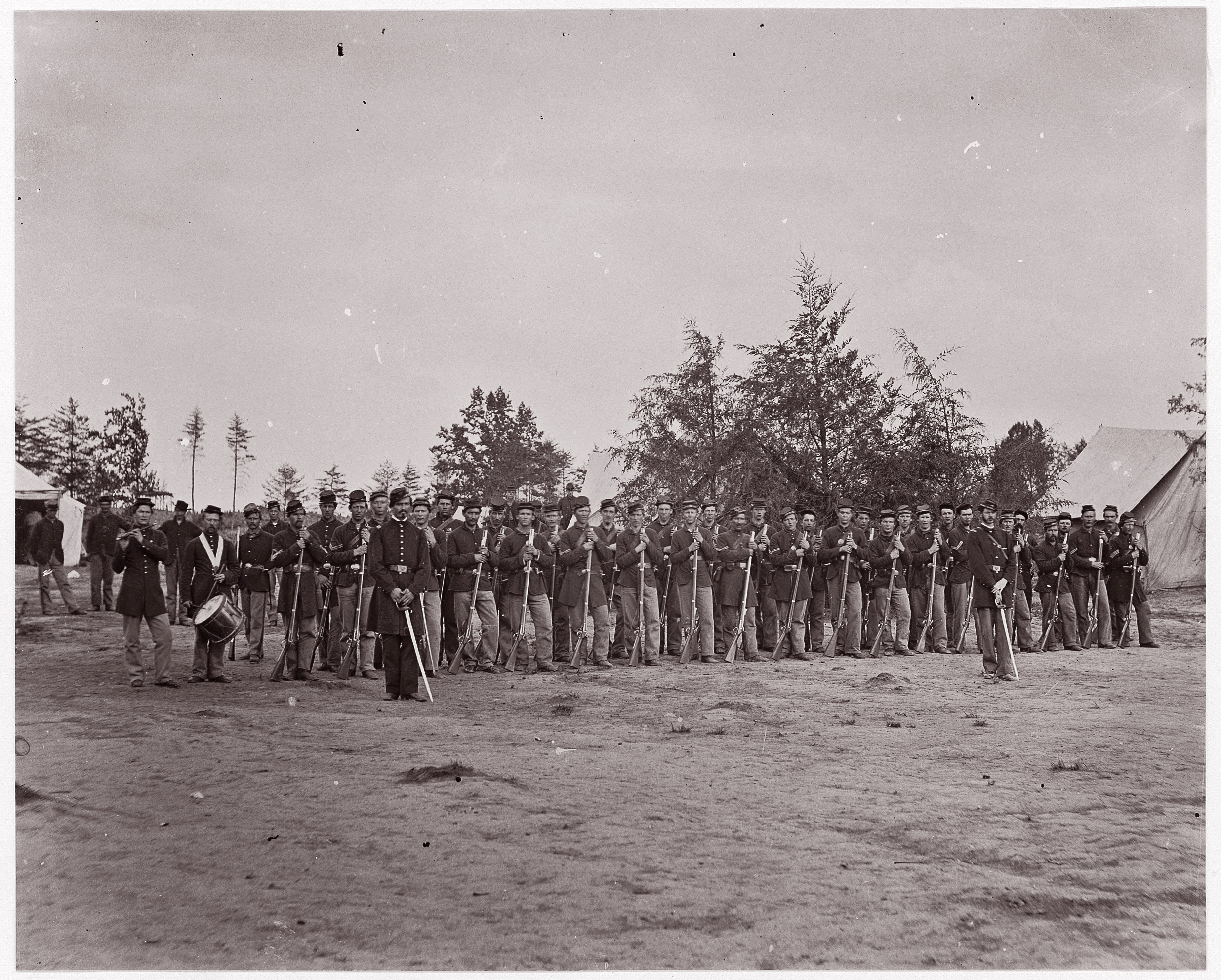
- 30th Pennsylvania Volunteer Infantry
- Active: June 9, 1861 to June 10, 1864
- Country: United States
- Allegiance: Union
- Branch: Infantry
- Engagements: Seven Days Battles; Battle of Mechanicsville; Battle of Gaines's Mill; Battle of Savage's Station; Battle of Glendale; Battle of Malvern Hill; Second Battle of Bull Run; Battle of South Mountain; Battle of Antietam; Battle of Fredericksburg; Battle of Gettysburg; Bristoe Campaign; Mine Run Campaign; Battle of the Wilderness; Battle of Spotsylvania Court House; Battle of North Anna; Battle of Cold Harbor

The 1st Pennsylvania Reserve Regiment, also known as the 30th Pennsylvania Volunteer Infantry, was a regiment in the Union Army during the American Civil War. It was a part of the famed Pennsylvania Reserve division in the Army of the Potomac for much of the war, and served in the Eastern Theater in a number of important battles, including Antietam, Fredericksburg, and Gettysburg.

== Organization ==
Company	Moniker	Primary Location of Recruitment	Captains
A	The Brandywine Guards	Chester County	Henry M. McIntire Mott Hooton
B	The Union Guards	Lancaster	Thomas B. Barton
C	The Keystone Guards; The Silfer Phalanx	Chester, Delaware County	Samuel E. Dyer; Joseph R. T. Coates; Edward Larkin
D	The Safe Harbor Artillery	Lancaster County	George H. Hess
E	The Lancaster Guards	Lancaster County	Aldus J. Neff
F	The Rockdale Rifle Guards	Crozerville and Rockdale, Delaware County	William C. Talley; Joseph P. Drew; Henry Huddleson
G	The Phoenix Artillery	Chester County	John R. Dobson
H	The Carlisle Light Infantry	Cumberland County	Robert McCartney
I	The Carlisle Guards	Cumberland County	Lemuel Todd
K	The Adams County Infantry	Adams County	Edward McPherson

== Service ==
The 1st Pennsylvania Reserves were assembled at Camp Wayne near West Chester, Pennsylvania on June 9, 1861, and mustered into the service on July 26, 1861, at Camp Carroll near Baltimore, Maryland under the command of Colonel Richard Biddle Roberts and Lieutenant Colonel Henry McIntire.

The regiment was attached to the following throughout the war:

- Dix's Command, the regional organization of troops led by John Adams Dix to September 1861
- 1st Brigade, George A. McCall's Pennsylvania Reserves Division, Army of the Potomac, to March 1862
- 1st Brigade, 2nd Division, I Corps, Army of the Potomac, to April 1862
- 1st Brigade, McCall's Division, Department of the Rappahannock, to June 1862
- 1st Brigade, 3rd Division, V Corps, Army of the Potomac, to August 1862
- 1st Brigade, 3rd Division, III Corps, Army of Virginia, to September 1862
- 1st Brigade, 3rd Division, I Corps, Army of the Potomac, to February 1863
- 1st Brigade, Pennsylvania Reserves Division, XXII Corps, to June 1863
- 1st Brigade, 3rd Division, V Corps, Army of the Potomac, to June 1864.

The 1st Pennsylvania Reserves mustered out June 10, 1864.

== Detailed service ==
Moved to Harrisburg, Pa., July 20; then reported to General Dix at Baltimore, Md., July 22, 1861. Moved to Annapolis, Md., July 27. Duty at Annapolis, Md., July 27 to August 30, 1861. Moved to Washington, D.C., then to Tennallytown, Md., August 30–31. Marched to Langley October 10, and duty at Camp Pierpont until March 1862. Reconnaissance to Dranesville December 6, 1861. Action at Dranesville December 20 (Company A). Advance on Manassas, Va., March 10–15. McDowell's advance on Fredericksburg, Va., April 9–19. Duty at Fredericksburg until May 31. Ordered to the Virginia Peninsula June. Seven Days before Richmond June 25-July 1. Battles of Mechanicsville June 26, Gaines Mill June 27, Charles City Cross Roads and Glendale June 30, and Malvern Hill July 1. At Harrison's Landing until August 16. Movement to join Pope August 16–26. Battle of Groveton August 29. Second Battle of Bull Run August 30. Maryland Campaign September 6–24. Battle of South Mountain September 14. Battle of Antietam September 16–17. Duty in Maryland until October 30. Movement to Falmouth October 30-November 19. Battle of Fredericksburg, December 12–15. "Mud March" January 20–24, 1863. Ordered to Washington, D.C., and duty in the defenses there until June 25. Rejoined the Army of the Potomac. Battle of Gettysburg, July 1–3. Pursuit of Lee July 5–24. Williamsport July 13. Bristoe Campaign October 9–22. Advance to line of the Rappahannock November 7–8. Rappahannock Station November 7. Mine Run Campaign November 26-December 2. Mine Run November 26–30. Rapidan Campaign May and June 1864. Battle of the Wilderness May 5–7; Laurel Hill May 8; Spotsylvania May 8–12; Spotsylvania Court House May 12–21. Assault on the Salient May 12. Harris Farm May 19. North Anna River May 23–26. Jericho Ford May 25. Line of the Pamunkey May 26–28. Totopotomoy May 28–31. Left front June 1.

== Casualties ==
The regiment lost a total of 174 men during service; 6 officers and 102 enlisted men killed or mortally wounded, 2 officers and 64 enlisted men died of disease.

Among the fallen was Lieutenant Colonel McIntire, who was wounded and captured at the Battle of Glendale and died of his wounds six months later.

== Commanders ==
- Colonel Richard Biddle Roberts - resigned November 1, 1862
- Colonel William Cooper Talley - commanded at the Battle of Antietam while still at the rank of captain when Col. Roberts was promoted to brigade command
- Lieutenant Colonel William Warren Stewart - commanded during the Bristoe Campaign
- Major Lemuel Todd - commanded after Col. Roberts was assigned to brigade command at the Battle of Gaines's Mill

== Images ==
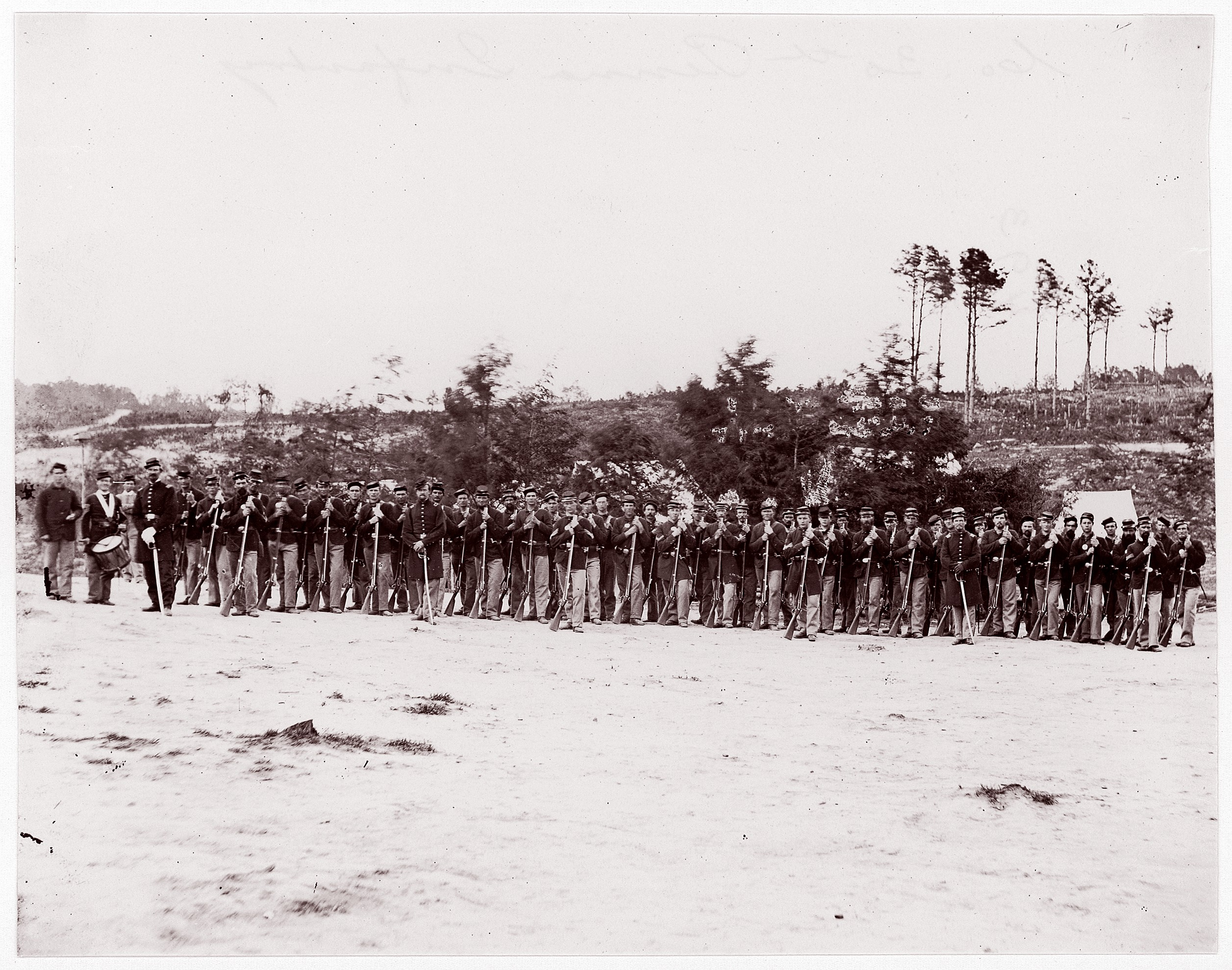
30th Pennsylvania Infantry

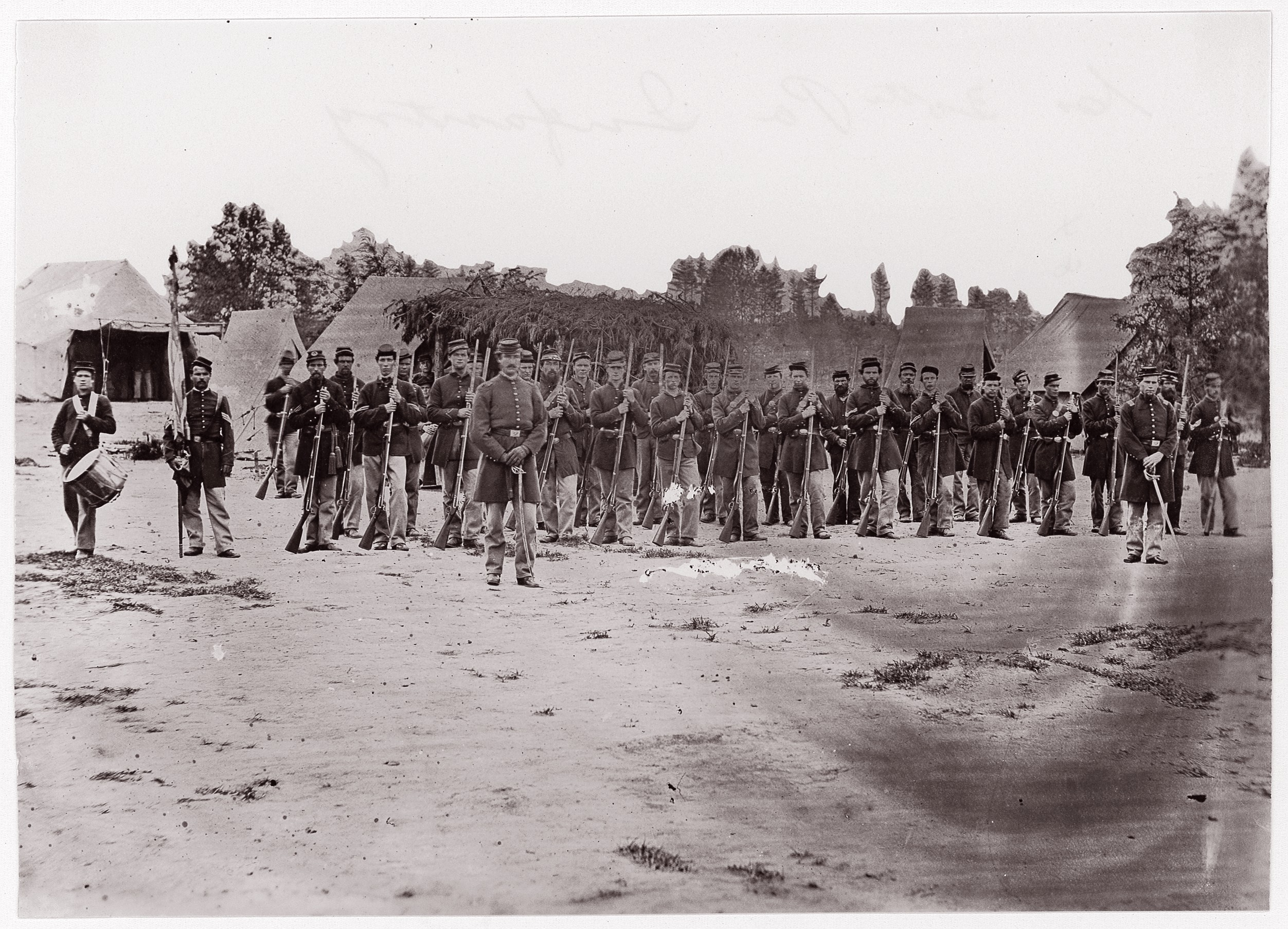
30th Pennsylvania Infantry

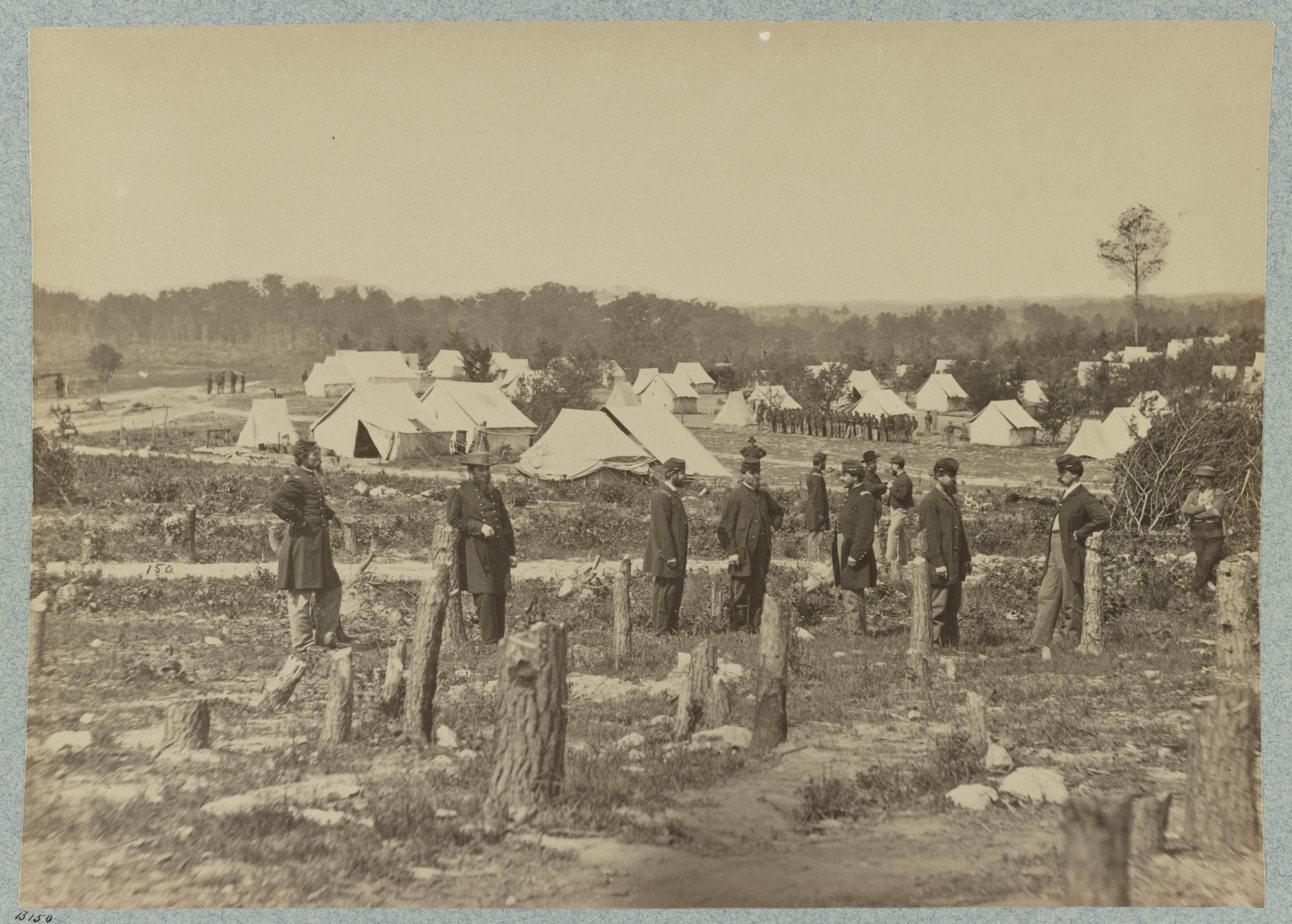
Camp of 30th Pennsylvania Infantry

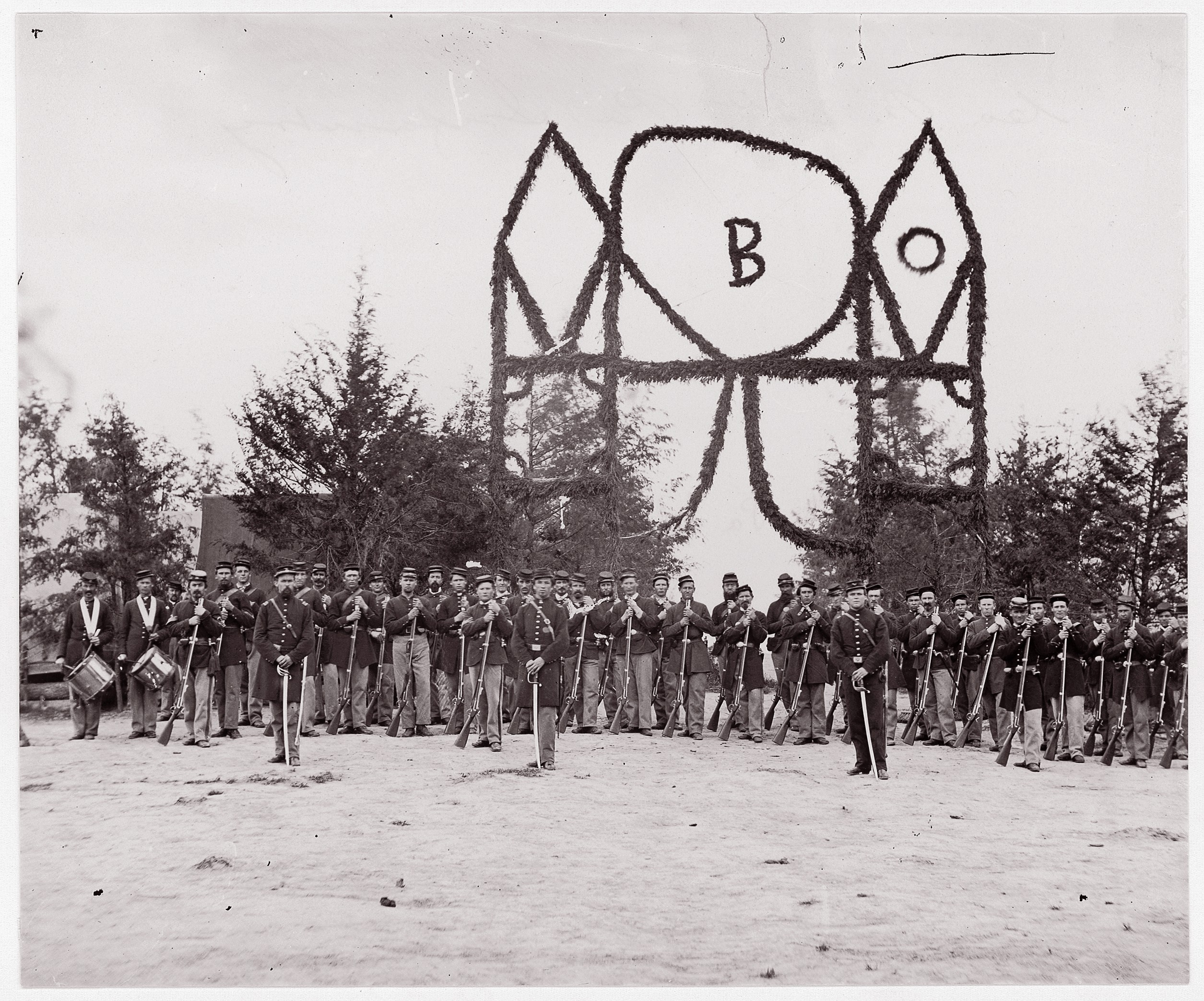
Co. B, 30th Pennsylvania Infantry

Drum Corps, 30th Pennsylvania Volunteer Infantry

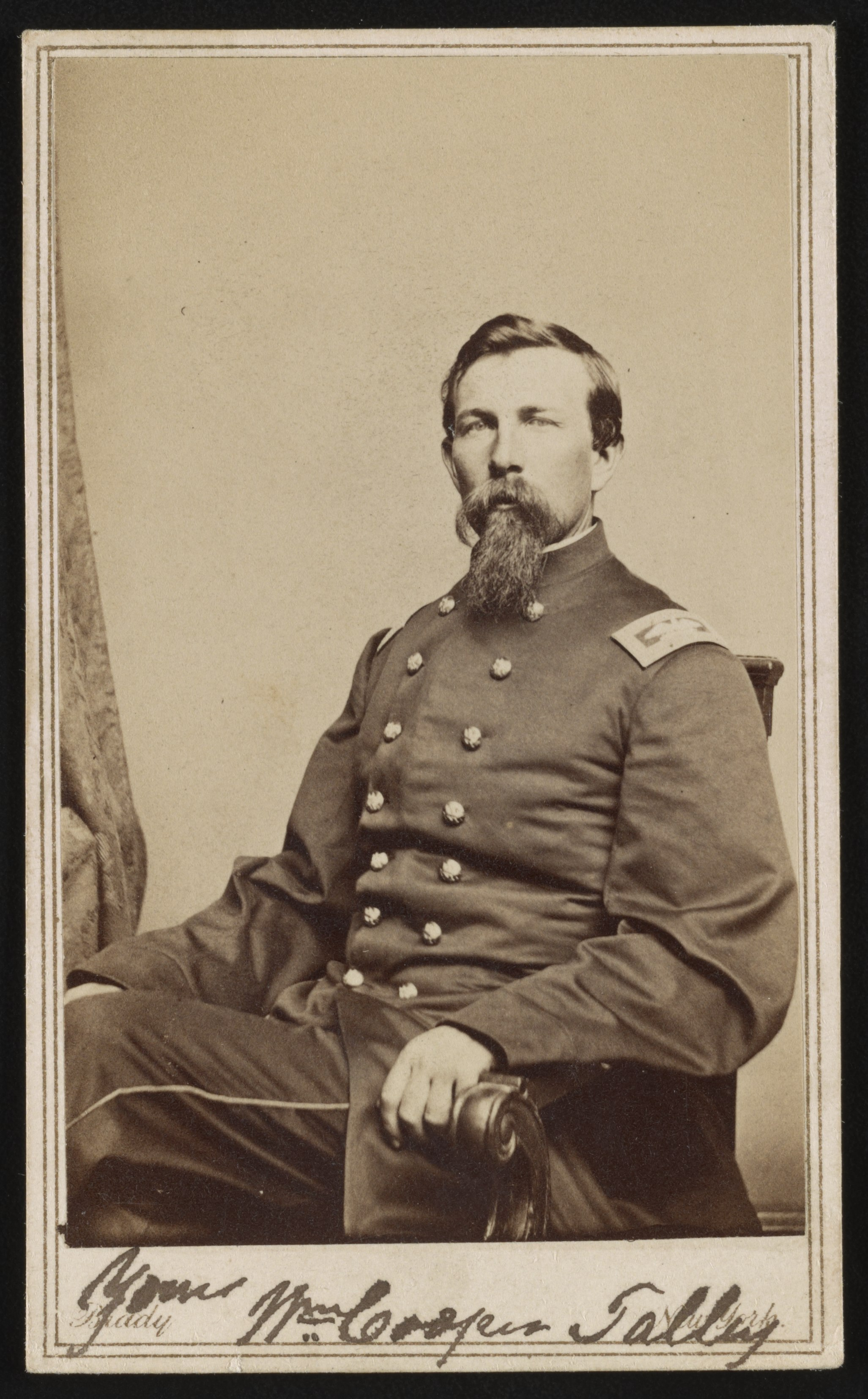
Brevet Brigadier General William Cooper Talley

== See also ==
- List of Pennsylvania Civil War Units
- Pennsylvania in the Civil War
