= William H. G. Bullard =

William Hannum Grubb Bullard
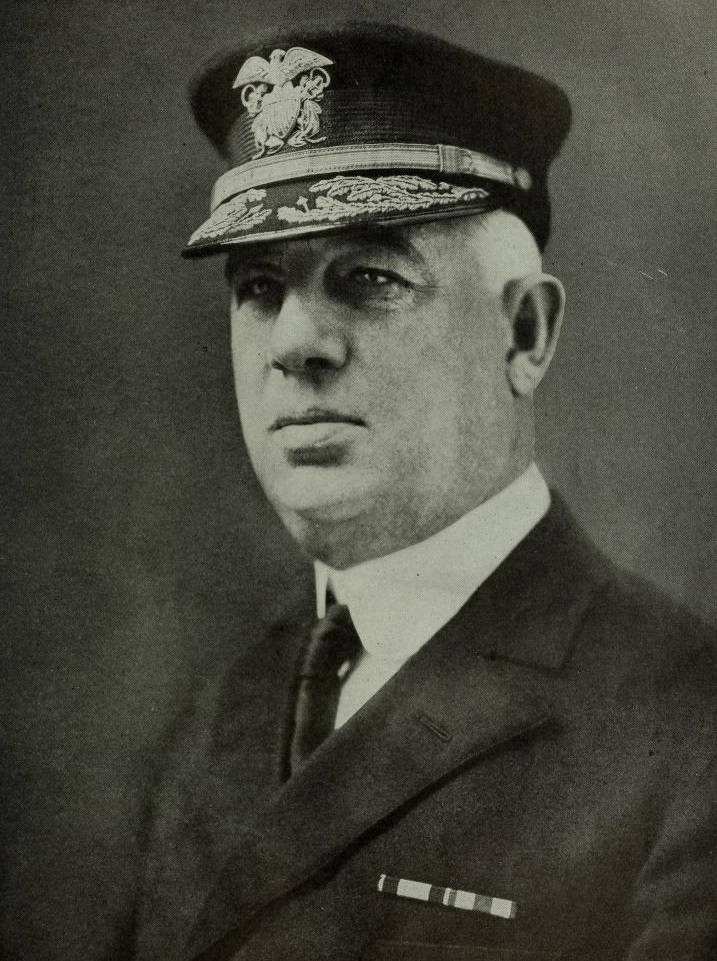
- William Hannum Grubb Bullard
- Born: December 6, 1866; Media, Pennsylvania
- Died: November 24, 1927 (aged 60); Washington, D.C.
- Military career
- Allegiance: United States of America
- Branch: United States Navy
- Service years: 1886–1922
- Rank: Rear Admiral
- Units: commanded the battleship Arkansas (BB-33); Organized the Yangtze Patrol force
- Commands: U.S.S. San Francisko, U.S.S. Arkansas in the Atlantic Fleet, and later the Grand Fleet, U.S. Naval Base at Malta, U.S. Naval Forces in the Eastern Mediterranean, Director of Communications in the Navy Department, Yangtze Patrol Force, Chairman of the National Radio Commission
- Conflicts: Spanish–American War; World War I

William Hannum Grubb Bullard (6 December 1866 – 24 November 1927) was an admiral of the United States Navy, whose service included duty during the Spanish–American War and World War I. After World War I, he established the Navy's patrol on China's Yangtze River. A noted electrical engineer, he wrote a popular handbook on naval electrical systems, and contributed to the use of radio in the Navy.

== Early life and education ==
William Bullard was born in Media, Pennsylvania, on December 6, 1866. His father was Orson Flagg Bullard, a member of the Pennsylvania legislature. William graduated from Media High School in 1882, as a member of the school's first graduating class. He attended the United States Naval Academy, graduating in 1886. He returned to the Naval Academy in the mid-1890s, where he participated on the officers' summer baseball team.

== Overseas duty ==
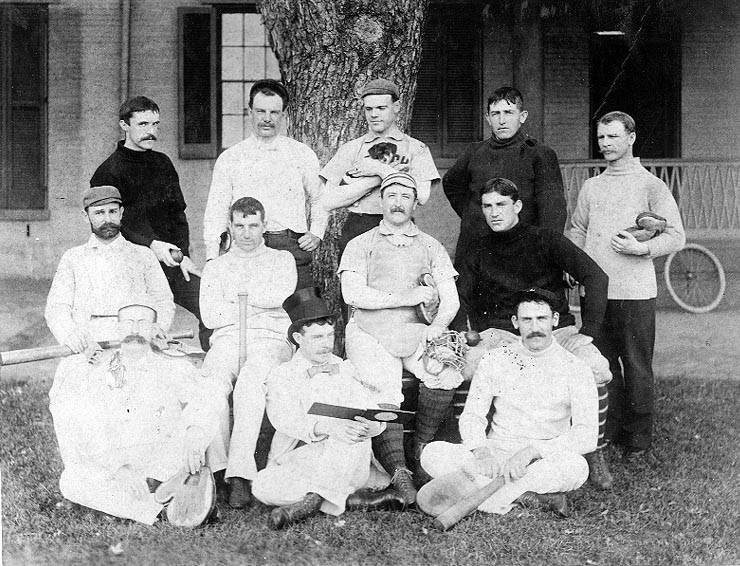
Ensign William H.G. Bullard (second row, second from left, during summer 1885 baseball season).

He served in USS Columbia (C-12) during the Spanish–American War and commanded the battleship USS Arkansas (BB-33), serving with the British Grand Fleet, during World War I.

Advanced to the rank of Rear Admiral, he commanded the U. S. Naval Base at Malta, and later commanded the U. S. Naval Forces in the Eastern Mediterranean, based at Corfu. During the latter tour, he was a member of the Inter-Allied Armistice Commission which effected, with notable tact and forbearance, the surrender of the Austro-Hungarian fleet to the United States.

On August 5, 1921, the Yangtze Patrol force was organized under Rear Admiral Bullard as part of the Asiatic Fleet. During the unsettled conditions in China during the 1920s and 1930s, the Navy patrolled the Yangtze to protect United States interests, lives, and property.

== Contributions to electrical engineering ==
Bullard gained a reputation as an authority on electrical systems and radio communications. In 1904, while still a junior officer, the then-lieutenant published through the United States Naval Institute a work titled Naval Electricians' Text and Handbook. Later retitled the Naval Electricians' Text Book, the work went through multiple editions, being re-released in 1908, 1911, 1915, and 1917.

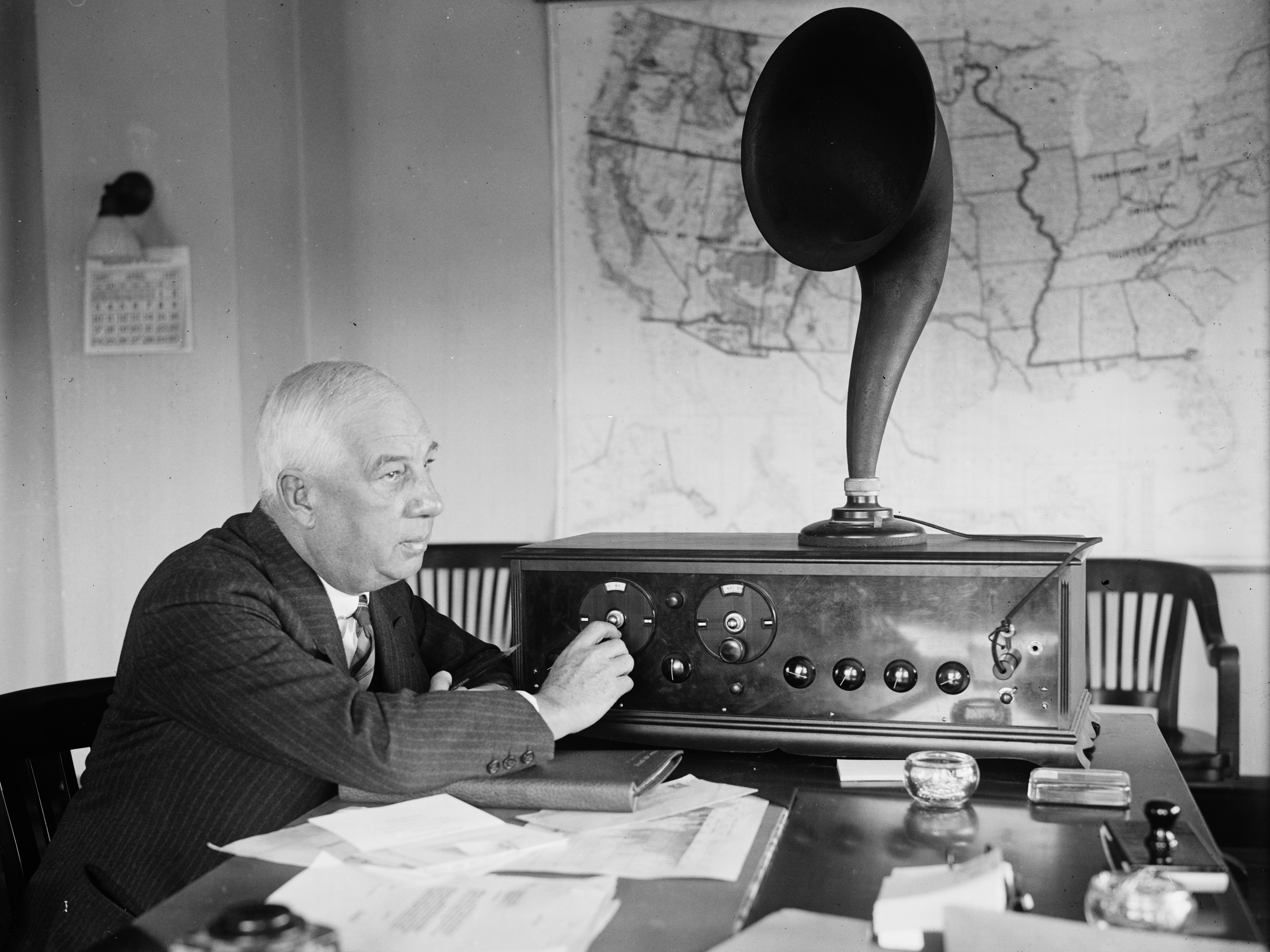
"Boss of the ether" tunes in. Rear Admiral W.H.G. Bullard, chairman of the newly created Federal Radio Commission in 1927 photo.

On 13 December 1912, Captain Bullard was appointed Superintendent of the Naval Radio Service, within the Bureau of Navigation. During his tenure, he developed a Handbook of Regulations (1913).

After World War I, Bullard served in 1919 as a member of the Inter-Allied Conference on Radio, and later served as Director of Naval Communications, Navy Department. In 1927, he was appointed as chairman of the newly created Federal Radio Commission but died shortly into his tenure.

== Retirement and legacy ==
Rear Admiral Bullard retired in 1922 and died in Washington, D.C., on November 24, 1927.

== Namesakes ==
Two ships have been named in Bullard's honor. In 1943, the Navy named the destroyer USS Bullard (DD-660) after him. In February 1946, construction was completed on the cable-laying vessel SS William H. G. Bullard (M. C. hull 2557), built for the U.S. Maritime Commission by Pusey and Jones Corporation of Wilmington, Del. The vessel was acquired by the Navy in 1953 and redesignated USS Neptune (ARC-2).
