= USS Bullard =

Fletcher-class destroyer

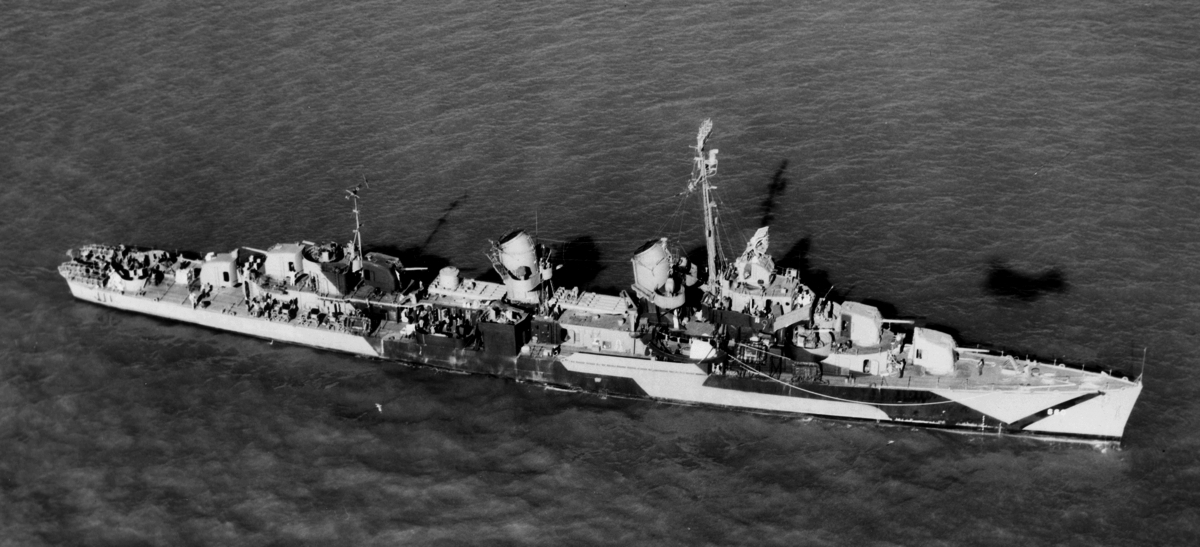
- USS Bullard (DD-660)

History

United States
- Namesake: William H. G. Bullard
- Builder: Federal Shipbuilding and Drydock Company, Kearny, New Jersey
- Laid down: 16 October 1942
- Launched: 28 February 1943
- Commissioned: 9 April 1943
- Decommissioned: 20 December 1946
- Stricken: 1 December 1972
- Motto: "What's in it for me!"
- Fate: Sold for scrap 3 December 1973

General characteristics
- Class & type: Fletcher-class destroyer
- Displacement: 2,050 long tons (2,083 t)
- Length: 376 ft 6 in (114.76 m)
- Beam: 39 ft 8 in (12.09 m)
- Draft: 17 ft 9 in (5.41 m)
- Propulsion: 60,000 shp (45,000 kW); 2 propellers
- Speed: 35 kn (65 km/h; 40 mph)
- Range: 6,500 nmi (12,000 km; 7,500 mi) at 15 kn (28 km/h; 17 mph)
- Complement: 329
- Armament: 5 × 5-inch 38 caliber guns, 4 × 40 mm AA guns, 4 × 20 mm AA guns, 10 × 21-inch (533 mm) torpedo tubes, 6 × depth charge projectors, 2 × depth charge tracks

USS Bullard (DD-660) was a Fletcher-class destroyer of the United States Navy, named for Rear Admiral William H. G. Bullard (1866–1927).

Bullard was launched 28 February 1943 by Federal Shipbuilding and Dry Dock Co., Kearny, N.J., sponsored by Mrs. H. G. Bullard, widow of Rear Admiral Bullard; and commissioned 9 April 1943.

== Service history ==
After conducting brief operations along the eastern seaboard and in the Caribbean, Bullard proceeded to the Pacific, arriving at Pearl Harbor 29 August 1943. With the exception of one voyage to California (10 September 1944 – 18 February 1945) she operated constantly in forward areas of the Pacific rendering fire support, plane guard, patrol, and radar picket services. She participated in

- the Wake Island raid (5–6 October 1943);
- Rabaul strike (11 November);
- the invasion of Tarawa (19 November – 1 December);
- the occupation of Kwajalein and Majuro Atolls (22 January – March 1944);
- Admiralty Islands landings (30 March – 13 April),
- Hollandia operation (16 April – 4 May);
- seizures of Saipan and of Guam (10 June – 17 August) and
- the Okinawa operation (15 March – 31 May 1945).

On 11 April 1945, during the Okinawa operation Bullard was slightly damaged by a Japanese kamikaze. Repairs completed at Okinawa, she departed on 31 May, and steamed to Leyte. Departing Leyte Gulf, 1 July, Bullard next participated in the 3rd Fleet raids against Japan (10 July – 15 August).

After the cessation of hostilities, Bullard remained in the Far East engaged in occupation duties until 10 November 1945, when she departed for San Pedro, Calif., arriving on 3 December. She operated along the west coast during most of 1946, and then reported to San Diego for inactivation. Bullard was placed out of commission in reserve on 20 December 1946.

Bullard was stricken from the Naval Vessel Register on 1 December 1972. She was sold on 3 December 1973 and broken up for scrap.

== Awards ==
Bullard received nine battle stars for her World War II service.
