= William Cooper Talley =

American politician (1831-1903)

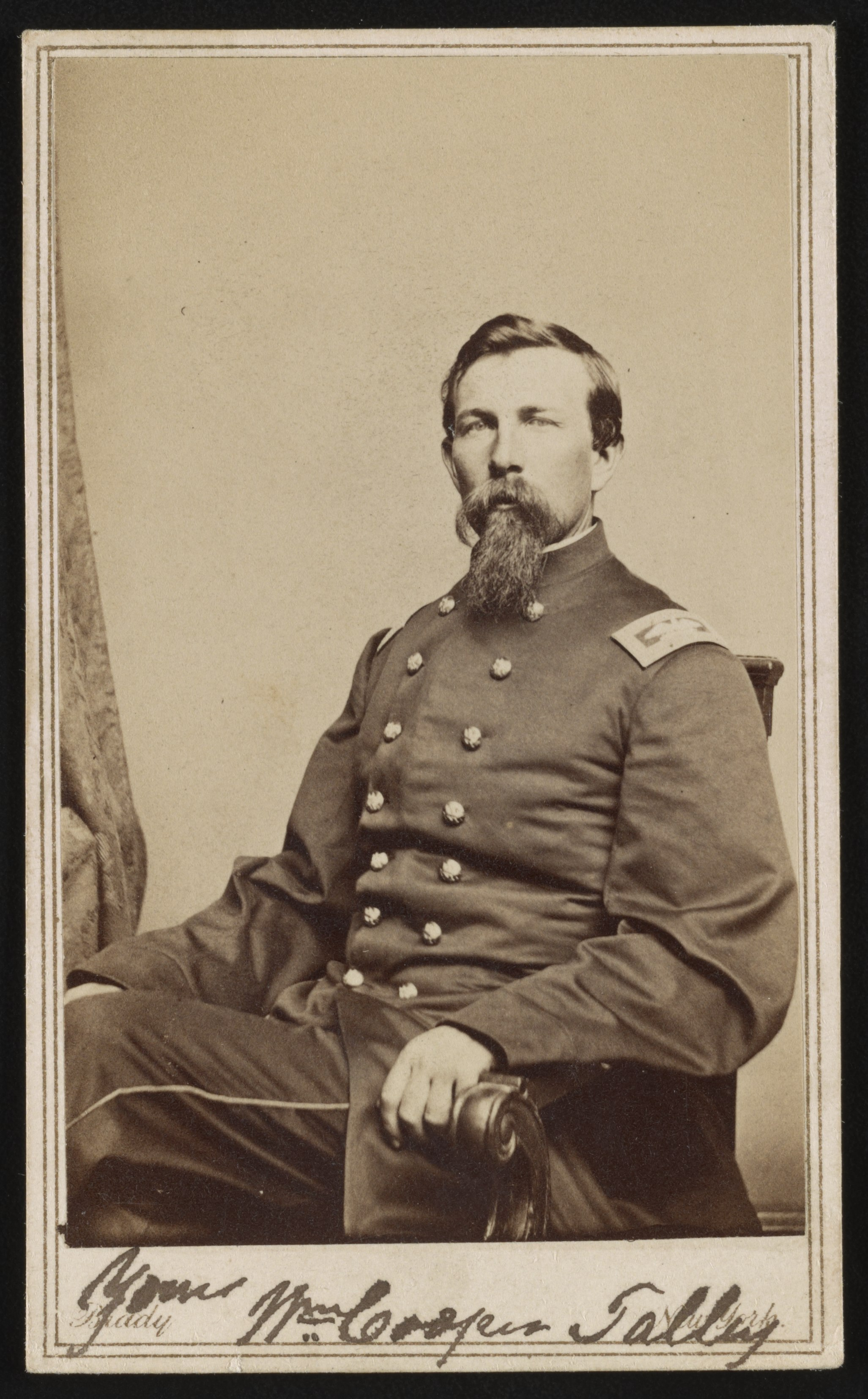

Pennsylvania House of Representatives, Delaware County
- In office 1874–1877
- Preceded by: Orson Flagg Bullard
- Succeeded by: Orson Flagg Bullard

Personal details
- Born: December 11, 1831 Brandywine Hundred, Delaware, US
- Died: October 20, 1903 (aged 71) Washington, D.C., US
- Resting place: Arlington National Cemetery, Arlington, Virginia, US
- Party: Democratic

Military service
- Allegiance: United States
- Branch/service: Union Army
- Years of service: 1861–1864
- Rank: Colonel; Brevet brigadier-general
- Commands: 1st Pennsylvania Reserve Regiment
- Battles/wars: American Civil War; Battle of Antietam; Battle of Spotsylvania; Battle of Fredericksburg; Battle of Gettysburg; Battle of the Wilderness

William Cooper Talley (December 11, 1831 – October 20, 1903) was an American politician from Pennsylvania who served as a Democratic member of the Pennsylvania House of Representatives for Delaware County from 1874 to 1877. He served as a colonel in the Union Army during the U.S. Civil War, fought in many of the key battles of the war and was promoted to brigadier general by brevet in 1865.

== Early life and education ==
Talley was born in Brandywine Hundred, Delaware, to Reverend Lewis S. and Priscilla (Clark) Talley. He attended the Forwood School and graduated from Professor Sudley's Academy in Wilmington, Delaware, in 1853.

== American Civil War ==
When the civil war broke out, Talley sold his newspaper and organized a company mainly from Delaware County, Pennsylvania known as the Rockdale Rifle Guards. The company became Company F of the 1st Pennsylvania Reserve Regiment and was mustered in to the Union Army in 1861 with Talley as captain.

At the Battle of Antietam, Talley was given command of his regiment by General Warren, the Corps Commander.

At the Battle of Spotsylvania, he commanded the 1st Brigade of the 5th Corps and was taken prisoner of war. After being captured, he was brought to General Richard S. Ewell's headquarters where Ewell offered to parole him but Talley declined. Talley and 700 captured Union soldier were freed the next day by the cavalry troops commanded by General Philip Sheridan.

Talley received his Colonel's commission on November 2, 1862.

He was mustered out on June 13, 1864.

By recommendation of General Samuel W. Crawford, Talley was promoted to brigadier general by brevet in 1865 for gallant and meritorious action at Antietam, Fredericksburg, Gettysburg, the Wilderness, Spotsylvania and other engagements.

== Career ==
Talley was the co-publisher of the Upland Union newspaper in Media, Pennsylvania, and publisher of the Delaware County Democrat newspaper in Chester, Pennsylvania. In 1876, Talley sold his interest in the Delaware County Democrat and became the owner of the National Democrat newspaper in Norristown, Pennsylvania.

He worked as the deputy collector and then collector for the Internal Revenue Service for the Seventh District of Pennsylvania.

Talley was elected to the Pennsylvania House of Representatives for Delaware County for the 1874, 1875 and 1876 terms. He served as chairman of the Ways and Means Committee and as a member of the Centennial Committee. He was not a candidate for reelection in 1877.

From 1877 to 1903, he worked as a proofer for the Congressional Record in the United States Government Printing Office in Washington, D.C.

== Personal life ==
Talley was a member of the Grand Army of the Republic, Post Wilde No. 25 in Chester, Pennsylvania. Talley is interred at the Arlington National Cemetery in Arlington, Virginia.

== See also ==
- List of American Civil War brevet generals (Union)

Pennsylvania House of Representatives
Preceded by Orson Flagg Bullard	Member of the Pennsylvania House of Representatives, Delaware County; 1874–1877	Succeeded by Orson Flagg Bullard
