= Henry McIntire =

Union Army colonel (1835–1863)

- Born: Henry Martyn McIntire; March 19, 1835; Woodside, Maryland, US
- Died: January 16, 1863 (aged 27) Baltimore, Maryland
- Buried: Oaklands Cemetery
- Allegiance: United States (Union)
- Branch: U.S. Army (Union Army)
- Service years: 1861–1862
- Rank: Lieutenant Colonel
- Commands: 1st Pennsylvania Reserve Regiment
- Conflicts: American Civil War; Battle of Beaver Dam Creek; Battle of Gaines' Mill; Battle of Glendale †
- Education: Yale College (BA 1856)

Henry Martyn McIntire (March 19, 1835 – January 16, 1863) was an American military officer who served as lieutenant colonel of the 1st Pennsylvania Reserve Regiment during the American Civil War. Severely wounded at the Battle of Glendale in June 1862, he resigned from the Union Army and succumbed to his wounds six months later.

== Early life and education ==
McIntire was born on March 19, 1835, in Woodside and grew up in Elkton, Maryland. His father was Andrew McIntire. He received his education at the Tennent School located in Hartsville, Pennsylvania. He went on to receive a Bachelor of Arts degree from Yale University in 1856 and was a member of Delta Kappa Epsilon. He attended Yale Law School and read law with Joseph J. Lewis in West Chester, Pennsylvania. McIntire gained admittance to the Chester County bar on September 15, 1858. He practiced law in West Chester until the outbreak of the Civil War in 1861.

== Civil War service ==
McIntire enlisted in the Union Army upon the outbreak of the war and was elected captain of the Brandywine Guards (Company A, 1st Pennsylvania Reserves, comprising mostly Chester County volunteers). Mustered at Harrisburg in the spring of 1861, this regiment marched to Camp Wayne at West Chester. McIntire's company was the first to occupy the camp, and therefore he served as camp commander until the regiment officially elected its officers on June 7, 1861. McIntire became lieutenant colonel under Colonel R. Biddle Roberts, former district attorney from Pittsburgh. On July 4, Governor Andrew Curtin reviewed the 1st and 7th regiments in West Chester.

On July 21, the 1st Pennsylvania was dispatched to Maryland following the Union defeat at the First Battle of Bull Run. In the spring of 1862, McIntire's regiment joined General Irvin McDowell's corps of the Army of the Potomac. During the Peninsula Campaign, the regiment served in General Fitz John Porter's corps and fought in its first major actions at the Battle of Beaver Dam Creek (June 26), the Battle of Gaines' Mill (June 27), and the Battle of Glendale (June 30). McIntire sustained a severe wound in the ankle, necessitating amputation, while repelling Confederate attacks at Glendale at 7:15 P.M. He later reported proudly that his regiment had conceded no ground despite sustaining heavy casualties during a long day of fighting. Captured by the Confederates and taken to Richmond, Virginia, he was exchanged for Lt. Col. A. S. Hamilton of the 1st Mississippi Infantry Regiment on July 29. He subsequently spent several months recuperating at the army hospital on Davids Island in New York.

== Death and legacy ==
Sent home to recuperate, McIntire was elected Chester County District Attorney without opposition in the fall of 1862. Still suffering from his wounds, he resigned his commission on January 7, 1863. He succumbed to his wounds on January 16 in Baltimore, Maryland, and was interred at Oaklands Cemetery near West Chester.

McIntire was one of four colonels from Chester County killed during the Civil War, alongside Thomas S. Bell Jr., George W. Roberts, and Charles Frederick Taylor.
