= William P. Worrall =

American politician (1827-1887)

Member of the Pennsylvania House of Representatives from the Delaware County district
- In office 1875–1876
- Succeeded by: Young Singleton Walter

Personal details
- Born: circa 1827
- Died: July 18, 1887 Ridley Township, Pennsylvania, U.S.
- Resting place: Chester Rural Cemetery, Chester, Pennsylvania, U.S.
- Party: Democratic

William P. Worrall (circa 1827 – July 18, 1887) was an American politician from Pennsylvania who served as a Democratic member of the Pennsylvania House of Representatives for Delaware County from 1875 to 1876.

== Early life ==
Worrall was born circa 1827 in Delaware County and worked as a railroad ticket agent and a farmer. Worrall served in Company D of the 124th Pennsylvania Infantry Regiment, known as "Gideon's Band", from August 11, 1862 to May 15, 1863 during the American Civil War.

== Career ==
He was elected to the Pennsylvania House of Representatives for Delaware County and served from 1875 to 1876. He had unsuccessful campaigns for reelection in 1877 and 1888.

In 1878, Worrall was elected as delegate to the Democratic State Convention. He was elected as supervisor for Delaware County from 1882 to 1883 and as justice of the peace for Ridley Township, Pennsylvania, in 1883.

Worrall died July 18, 1887, in Ridley Township and was interred at Chester Rural Cemetery in Chester, Pennsylvania.

== Personal life ==
On May 20 1858, Worrall married Elizabeth Holland.
