= Young Singleton Walter =

American politician (1811–1883)

Member of the Pennsylvania House of Representatives from the Delaware County district
- In office 1877–1880
- Preceded by: William P. Worrall
- Succeeded by: Robert Chadwick

Personal details
- Born: August 11, 1811 Philadelphia, Pennsylvania
- Died: May 22, 1883 (aged 71) Chester, Pennsylvania
- Resting place: Chester Rural Cemetery
- Party: Republican

Young Singleton Walter (August 11, 1811 – May 22, 1883) was an American politician from Pennsylvania who served as a Republican member of the Pennsylvania House of Representatives for Delaware County from 1877 to 1880. He established the Delaware County Republican newspaper in 1833 and served as editor for 50 years.

== Biography ==
Walter was born in Philadelphia, Pennsylvania. He worked as a printing apprentice in Philadelphia and established the Delaware County Republican newspaper in Darby, Pennsylvania in 1833. He moved the paper to Chester, Pennsylvania in 1841 and built a brick building on Market Street between 2nd and 3rd Streets in 1875 for its operations. He worked as editor until 1883. Under Walter, the paper was pro Whig and then pro Republican in political viewpoints and a strong advocate for the abolition of slavery. The newspaper was sold to Ward R. Bliss in 1882.

Walter worked as inspector for the United States Custom Service in Marcus Hook, Pennsylvania in 1845 and as postmaster for the United States Postal Service for the Chester post office from 1861 to 1865.

Walter was elected to the Chester City Council and served from 1870 to 1875 including as president from 1874 to 1875. He was elected to the Pennsylvania House of Representatives for Delaware County and served from 1877 to 1880. He was not a candidate for reelection in 1880.

Walter died in Chester, Pennsylvania and was interred at Chester Rural Cemetery.
