= Jane Taylor =

Jane Taylor may refer to:

- Jane Taylor (poet), (1783–1824), author of the words for the song "Twinkle, Twinkle, Little Star"
- Jane Taylor (science writer), (c. 1817–1820 — c. 1904–1907), American author of anatomy and physiology textbooks
- Jane Taylor (South African writer), (1956–2023), South African writer, playwright and academic
- Jane Taylor (lawyer), chair of New Zealand Post
- Jane Taylor (singer), (born 1972) English singer-songwriter
- Jane Taylor (tennis), (born 1972), Australian tennis player
