= Elizabeth Wagner Reed =

American geneticist

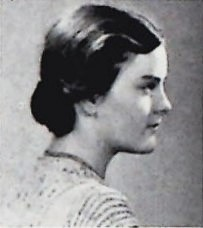
- Wagner from Makio, the Ohio State University 1933 yearbook
- Born: Elizabeth Cleland Wagner; August 27, 1912; Baguio, Philippine Islands
- Died: July 14, 1996 (aged 83); Minneapolis, Minnesota, U.S.
- Other names: E. W. Beasley, Elizabeth Wagner Beasley, E. W. Reed, E. C. Wagner
- Occupations: Scientist and academic
- Years active: 1932–1992

Elizabeth Wagner Reed (August 27, 1912 – July 14, 1996) was an American geneticist and one of the first scientists to work on Drosophila speciation. She taught women's studies courses and had a particular interest in research aimed at recovering the history of nineteenth-century women scientists. Born in the Philippines to a Northern Irish nurse and an American civil servant, she grew up in Carroll, Ohio. After earning bachelor's, master's, and PhD degrees from Ohio State University, she became a teacher with an interest in genetics. In the 1940s, she worked with her husband on plant genetics at the Texas Agricultural Experiment Station. After he was killed in action during World War II, she returned to Ohio and conducted studies on penicillin at the Ohio State Research Foundation.

After a second marriage to Sheldon C. Reed, the couple became research partners, first at Harvard University and from 1947 at the Dight Institute for Human Genetics at the University of Minnesota. As her husband directed the institute which had rules against nepotism, although she had a work station at the institute, Reed was not listed as staff until the 1970s. She was one of the few women who performed pioneering work in genetics. Her studies first focused on species evolution, for which she undertook statistical analysis and comparison of minute differences in the Drosophila genus of flies. Later, as the couple's interest shifted to human genetics, the Reeds published works on congenital disorders and diseases. They were in favor of genetic counseling based on an understanding of how such disorders occurred, especially in connection with family planning.

In addition to her genetic work, Reed wrote about sexism toward women scientists. An active women's rights advocate, she not only strove to mentor other women in the profession, but to recover the histories of women scientists. Her book American Women in Science before the Civil War (1992), reclaimed the contributions and biographies of twenty-two women who published in science before the American Civil War. Among them were Eunice Newton Foote and Mary Amelia Swift. Reed's own legacy was obscured by her husband's prominence, until her contributions were recovered by Marta Velasco Martín in 2020.

== Early life and education ==
Map of Luzon Island

Elizabeth Cleland Wagner was born on August 27, 1912, in Baguio, on the island of Luzon, in the Philippines to Catherine (née Cleland) and John O. Wagner. Her mother was from Killyleagh, Northern Ireland, but was working as a nurse and nurse trainer in the Philippines when she met her husband. Her father served in the Spanish-American War and afterwards worked in various civil service positions during the period when the Philippines was an unincorporated territory of the United States, including as a court interpreter and secretary to the Governor of the Mountain Province on Luzon. Her only sibling died in infancy. In 1917, the family returned to Wagner's home state of Ohio and settled in Fairfield County, where her father operated a fruit orchard.

Wagner grew up near Carroll, Ohio, and graduated from Canal Winchester High School. From 1930, she furthered her studies at Ohio State University, majoring in botany. She excelled in her studies and in her second year had the highest marks in her class. She graduated with honors and was elected to the academic honor society Phi Beta Kappa, in 1933. With support from the Ohio State Graduate School, Wagner earned her master's degree in 1934 and a PhD in 1936. After graduation, she did further studies in 1937 in plant research, with funding provided by the Sherwin-Williams Paint Company. Because of biases against women, Wagner was told she should publish her research using only her initials. Thus, her thesis, Effects of Certain Insecticides and Inert Materials upon the Transpiration Rate of Bean Plants, published in 1939, appeared in the name of E. C. Wagner.

== Career ==
=== Early teaching career (1938–1943) ===
After completing her studies, Wagner was hired as a biology and chemistry instructor at Atlantic Christian College in Wilson, North Carolina. In 1938, she was promoted to head the school's biology department and worked there until her marriage in 1940. Wagner married James O. Beasley, a pioneering plant geneticist, on September 17, 1940. After their marriage, the couple moved to College Station, Texas, where both were employed at the Texas Agricultural Experiment Station. Beasley was drafted to fight in World War II in 1942 shortly after Wagner published her second paper and just prior to the birth of their son John in April. Soon after, Beasley went missing in action and Wagner contacted his friend, Sheldon C. Reed, to see if he had any information. She returned to Ohio with their son and lived with her parents during this time, while working on penicillin studies at the Ohio State Research Foundation. Wagner was notified in November 1943, that Beasley had been in killed in action, in September 1943 in Italy. He was subsequently awarded a Purple Heart.

=== Genetics work (1944–1966) ===
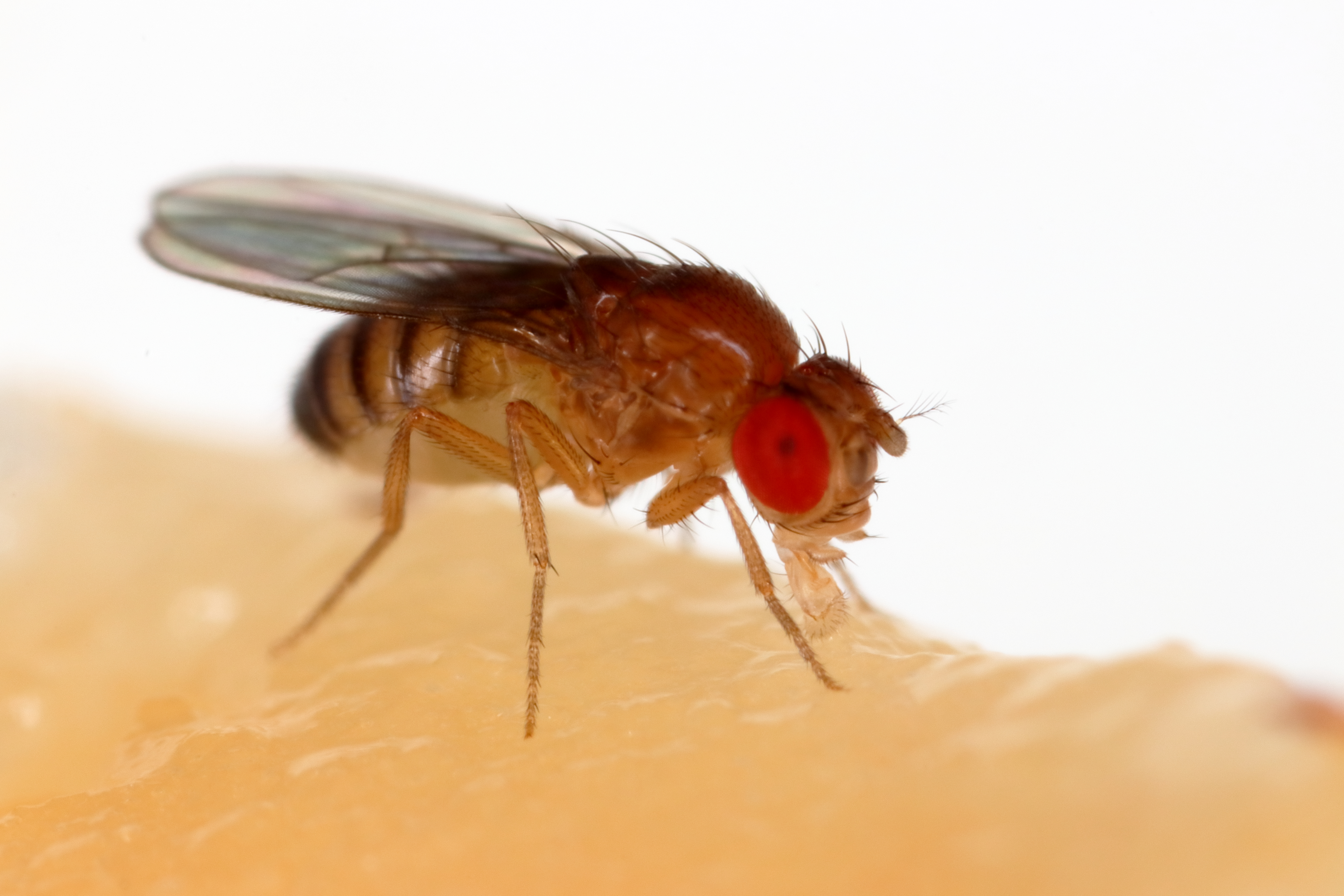
Drosophila melanogaster

In 1944, Wagner took a post at Vassar College in Poughkeepsie, New York, as an assistant professor in plant sciences. In 1945, she relocated to Delaware, Ohio, and taught botany at Ohio Wesleyan University. On August 20, 1946, she and Sheldon Reed, who had remained in touch, married. He was at the time an assistant professor at Harvard University, teaching biology. After their marriage, the couple lived in Cambridge, Massachusetts, and both worked at Harvard. They began collaborating on research at that time and thereafter jointly published works. Their first project concerned the speciation of flies, which was published as Morphological Differences and Problems of Speciation in Drosophila in March 1948. Reed gave birth to their daughter, Catherine, that same month. By the time the paper was published, the family had moved to Minneapolis, Minnesota, where Sheldon had become the director of the Dight Institute for Human Genetics at the University of Minnesota in 1947.

Although Reed had a desk at the Dight Institute from 1947 to 1966, she never held an academic position with the institute because of nepotism rules. Her nominal tie was to the University of Minnesota. She nevertheless continued to work with Sheldon and publish works on genetics. Their next two papers, Natural Selection in Laboratory Populations of Drosophila (1948) and Natural Selection in Laboratory Populations of Drosophila II: Competition between a White Eye Gene and Its Wild Type Allele (1950), focused on Drosophila melanogaster and natural selection. These studies were important in the development of new theoretical and methodological approaches, using statistical analysis and comparison of minute differences, to studying the process of speciation. As a pioneer in the work on Drosophila genetics, Reed was one of the women who contributed to establishing and standardizing processes to study species evolution.

From 1950, the Reeds changed from studying flies to human genetics and published works together on intellectual disability. In June 1951, their son William was born. Many of their works, like a 1958 follow-up study of former residents from the turn-of-the-century at the Minnesota Experimental School for the Feeble Minded in Faribault, and a 1962 study on intelligence, focused on families and attempted to determine whether certain traits were genetic. They became proponents of genetic counseling, studying parental genes to determine the probable source of children's congenital disorders or diseases, in an effort to mitigate and understand how they occurred. Their best known joint book, which gave Reed lead author position, was Mental Retardation: A Family Study, published in 1965.

=== Women's studies (1950–1992) ===
From 1950, Reed was interested in writing about women and studying sexism in science. Having been a member of Sigma Delta Epsilon, an organization dedicated to fostering women in their scientific endeavors, she recognized that issues of self-esteem, family obligations, and sexual discrimination they faced were largely responsible for women leaving the profession. That year, she published Productivity and Attitudes of Seventy Scientific Women, (Note: Reed published her works on women using her full name rather than initials.) which analyzed the impact of marriage and childbirth on scientific careers. She noted that of the women in her sample four-fifths regardless of marital status indicated working was a necessity for financial reasons. She concluded that in her study group marriage and children were the primary reason women abandoned scientific careers. Aware of the difficulties, Reed tried to encourage members of Sigma Delta Epsilon to continue working and to know their rights. She was a committed women's rights activist, supporter of the National Abortion Rights Action League, and served on the board of Planned Parenthood.

The push of activists in the Women's Liberation Movement in the 1970s brought about the advent of women's studies courses. A central role of the new field was to recover the histories of women's participation and contributions to society. In 1992, Reed published American Women in Science before the Civil War, which recovered the histories of twenty-two American women scientists who had published prior to the American Civil War. (Note: Besides Foote and Swift, the other scientists recovered by Reed included: Elizabeth Cary Agassiz, Catharine Esther Beecher, Jane Colden, Eunice Powers Cutter, Dorothea Lynde Dix, Foote, Lydia Folger Fowler, Sophia Bledsoe Herrick, Mary Putnam Jacobi, Laura H. Johnson, Frances Green McDougall, Maria Mitchell, Margaretta Hare Morris, Hannah Bouvier Peterson, Almira Lincoln Phelps, Mary Amelia Swift, Charlotte de Bernier Taylor, Jane Taylor, Mary Townsend, Ellen Smith Tupper, Jane Kilby Welsh, and Emma Hart Willard.) The book, along with Ladies in the Laboratory by Mary R. S. Creese, was acknowledged by Tina Gianquitto, a professor at the Colorado School of Mines, whose work focuses in on nineteenth-century women scientists, as being one of two sources that gave extensive historical and biographical information on women scientists of that era. Historian William P. Palmer noted in 2011 that Reed had been "the most thorough biographer of Mary Amelia Swift". In a different chapter of the book, about Eunice Newton Foote, Reed wrote that Foote's experiments confirmed that when subjected to sunlight, carbon dioxide became warmer than air "thereby demonstrating what we call the greenhouse effect today". (Note: Twenty-first century authors have tended to credit retired petroleum geologist Ray Sorenson, who came across Foote's work in The Annual of Scientific Discovery and published about her in 2011, with Foote's recovery as the woman who first recognized the greenhouse effect. Reed's recognition in 1992, of Foote's accomplishment preceded Sorenson's work by almost two decades, but Sorenson's work recognized that Foote had preceded John Tyndall's work, who had up to that time been considered as the person who had discovered the greenhouse effect.)

=== Later career (1966–1980) ===
In 1966, Reed was officially hired by the University of Minnesota to develop the Minnesota Mathematics and Science Teaching project, known as Minnemast. The program was funded by the National Science Foundation and aimed to focus on better science and math education for kindergarten and primary school children. Reed worked on the project through 1970. The project developed twenty-nine teaching plans, six of which were created by Reed. She was still working at the Dight Institute and was part of the staff in the 1970s, as well as serving as co-director of research for the Minnesota Genetics League. She taught courses at the University of Minnesota and gave courses on women's contributions throughout history at the university's Continuing Education and Extension Department.

== Death and legacy ==
Reed died on July 14, 1996, in Minneapolis, Minnesota. Her legacy in genetics was obscured and according to scholar Marta Velasco Martín, the academic record omitted the involvement of Reed and other women scientists from the historic record of early genetic research. Reed's work was hidden behind that of her more prominent husband, although he acknowledged their partnership. This same fate befell women scientists like Foote, whose biography was "recovered" by Reed. Foote had told Elizabeth Cady Stanton in 1868 that women's work was often claimed by men for self-serving reasons. Reed's legacy, along with that of Natasha Sivertzeva-Dobzhansk and María Monclús, was recovered in the paper Women and Partnership Genealogies in Drosophila Population Genetics, written by Velasco Martín in 2020, to confirm that women were pioneers in genetics, although leading historians tended to ignore their contributions. On 22 April 2023, The New York Times feature "Overlooked No More" honored Reed.

== Selected publications ==
- Wagner, E. C. (1939). Effects of Certain Insecticides and Inert Materials upon the Transpiration Rate of Bean Plants (PhD). Columbus, Ohio: Ohio State University. OCLC 65405151. PMC 437783.
- Beasley, E. W. (1942). "Effects of Some Chemically Inert Dusts upon the Transpiration Rate of Yellow Coleus Plants". Plant Physiology. 17 (1). Rockville, Maryland: American Society of Plant Biologists: 101–108. doi:10.1104/pp.17.1.101. ISSN 0032-0889. OCLC 4645244692. PMC 438296. PMID 16653746.
- Reed, S. C.; Reed, E. W. (March 1948). "Morphological Differences and Problems of Speciation in Drosophila" (PDF). Evolution. 2 (1). Lancaster, Pennsylvania: Society for the Study of Evolution: 40–48. doi:10.1111/j.1558-5646.1948.tb02730.x. ISSN 0014-3820. OCLC 269309298. PMID 18860233. S2CID 6730465.
- Reed, S. C.; Reed, E. W. (June 1948). "Natural Selection in Laboratory Populations of Drosophila". Evolution. 2 (2). Lancaster, Pennsylvania: Society for the Study of Evolution: 176–186. doi:10.1111/j.1558-5646.1948.tb02739.x. ISSN 0014-3820. OCLC 7352514281. S2CID 37671503.
- Reed, S. C.; Reed, E. W. (March 1950). "Natural Selection in Laboratory Populations of Drosophila II: Competition between a White Eye Gene and Its Wild Type Allele". Evolution. 4 (1). Lancaster, Pennsylvania: Society for the Study of Evolution: 34–42. ISSN 0014-3820. OCLC 5551131154.
- Reed, Elizabeth Wagner (January 1950). "Productivity and Attitudes of Seventy Scientific Women". American Scientist. 38 (1). New Haven, Connecticut: Sigma Xi: 132–135. ISSN 0003-0996. JSTOR 27826298. OCLC 5551779579.
- Reed, S. C.; Reed, E. W. (1957). "The Relatives of the Mentally Retarded". Human Heredity. 7 (2). Basel, Switzerland: Karger Publishers: 381–382. doi:10.1159/000151011. ISSN 0001-5652. OCLC 7016721043. PMID 13469186.
- Reed, E. W.; Reed, S. C. (1965). Mental Retardation: A Family Study. Philadelphia, Pennsylvania: W.B. Saunders Company. OCLC 794036611.
- Reed, Elizabeth Wagner (January 1971). "Temperature Distribution in Water". The Science Teacher. 38 (1). Arlington, Virginia: National Science Teachers Association: 53. ISSN 0036-8555. JSTOR 24119870. OCLC 425372216.
- Reed, Elizabeth Wagner (1992). American Women in Science before the Civil War (PDF). Minneapolis, Minnesota: University of Minnesota. OCLC 28126164. Archived from the original on July 8, 2016.
