= John Kirk Townsend =

U.S. ornithologist (1809-1851)

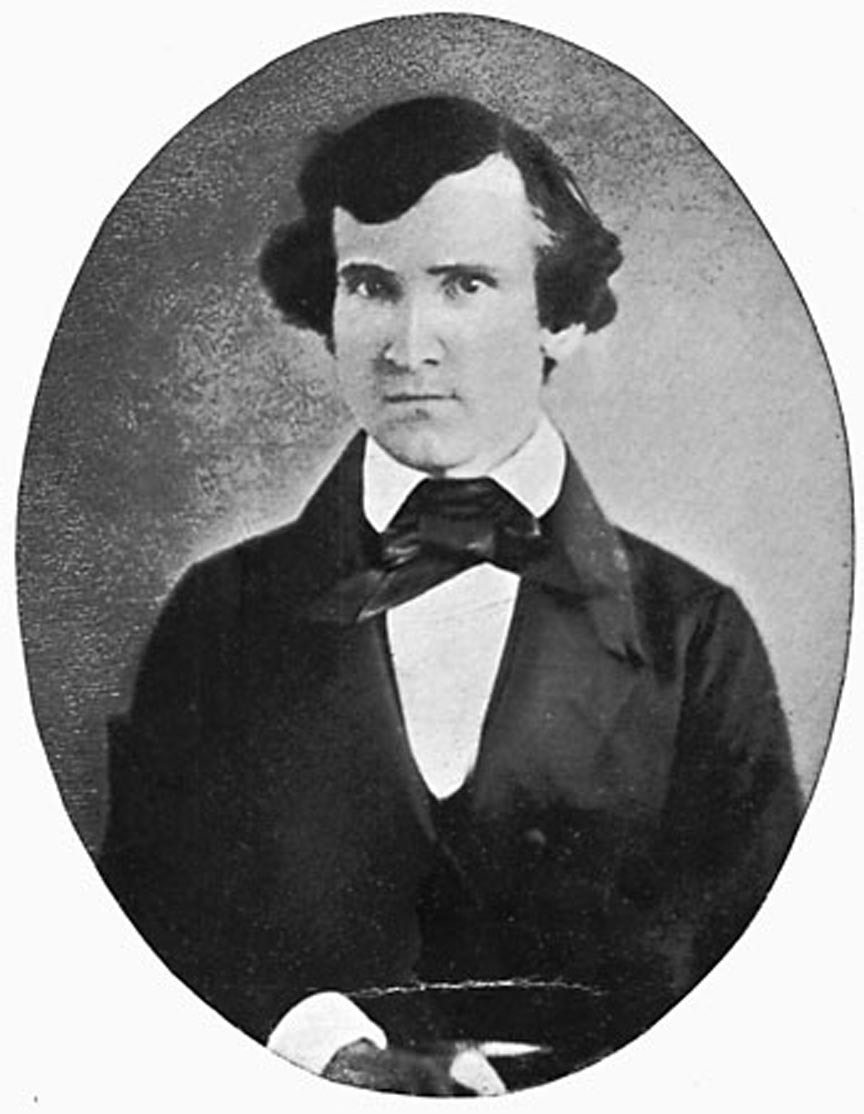
- John Kirk Townsend
- Born: August 10, 1809; Philadelphia, Pennsylvania
- Died: February 6, 1851 (aged 41); Washington DC
- Cause of death: Arsenic poisoning (related to his work)
- Education: Westtown School, West Chester, Pennsylvania
- Known for: Collecting many samples
- Relatives: Mary Townsend (sister)
- Scientific career
- Fields: Ornithology
- Author abbrev. (zoology): Townsend

John Kirk Townsend (August 10, 1809 – February 6, 1851) was an American naturalist, ornithologist and collector.

Townsend was a Quaker born in Philadelphia, the son of Charles Townsend and Priscilla Kirk. He attended Westtown School in West Chester, Pennsylvania and was trained as a physician and pharmacist. He developed an interest in natural history in general and bird collecting in particular. In 1833, he was invited by the botanist Thomas Nuttall to join him on Nathaniel Jarvis Wyeth's second expedition across the Rocky Mountains to the Pacific Ocean. Townsend collected a number of animals new to science. These included birds such as the mountain plover, Vaux's swift, chestnut-collared longspur, black-throated gray warbler, Townsend's warbler and sage thrasher, and a number of mammals such as the Douglas squirrel; several of these were described by Bachman (1839) from samples collected by Townsend. Townsend collected skulls of indigenous people, procured by stealing them from graves.

== Family ==
John Kirk Townsend was the son of Charles Townsend and Priscilla Kirk, he had five brothers and four sisters. His sister Mary, a naturalist with an interest in entomology, wrote a popular book called "Life In the Insect World" in 1844. Mary and another sister, Hannah, wrote The Anti-Slavery Alphabet in 1846, which was sold at the Anti-Slavery Fair in Philadelphia. His brother Edward was President of the Philadelphia Institution for Instruction of the Blind and helped organize the Philadelphia Dental College.

== Oregon ==
While at Wyeth's Fort William in Oregon, Townsend served as the appointed magistrate to the first public trial by Europeans in Oregon. This occurred when the post's gunsmith, Thomas J. Hubbard, attacked and killed the fort's tailor in an argument over a young native girl. The gunsmith was acquitted by a jury when they ruled the death was justifiable homicide.

== Work ==
Townsend collected numerous animal specimens during his travels. He sent many of these back to John James Audubon for further assessment and characterization. Audubon gave Townsend broad authority in naming specimens that he collected.

On his return, Townsend wrote The Narrative of a Journey across the Rocky Mountains to the Columbia River and a Visit to the Sandwich Islands (1839). This is a narrative of a journey by Wyeth's expedition over the Rocky Mountains to the Pacific Ocean between 1834 and 1835.

A number of mammals are named for Townsend. Many of these were described from specimens collected during his travels. Townsend's ground squirrel (Spermophilus townsendii) is endemic to the southwestern region of the state of Washington. Townsend's chipmunk (Tamias townsendii), Townsend's mole (Scapanus townsendii), and Townsend's vole (Microtus townsendii) occur in the northwest of the United States and southwest of British Columbia. Townsend's pocket gopher (Thomomys townsendii) is found in southern Oregon, northern California, northern Nevada, and through the Snake River Valley in Idaho. Townsend's big-eared bat (Corynorhinus townsendii) is found from southern British Columbia south through the western United States to southern Mexico. The whitetail jackrabbit (Lepus townsendii) ranges through southern Canada and the western, central US through eastern California and Colorado. The Townsend's warbler and Townsend's solitaire are also named after Mr. Townsend.

Townsend died of arsenic poisoning. He had developed a formula used in taxidermy preparations and arsenic was the "secret" ingredient.
