= Jane Kilby Welsh =

American geologist and writer (1783–1853)

Jane Kilby Welsh (1783–1853, sometimes known as Welch) was an American geologist and writer of educational books for children and students. Her works include A Botanical catechism: containing introductory lessons for students in botany ("by a lady") and the two-volume Familiar lessons in mineralogy and geology, designed for the use of young persons and lyceums.

Welsh was one of 22 women described by Elizabeth Wagner Reed in her 1992 book American Women in Science before the Civil War, although Reed said "There is little to be found out about the details of Welsh's life." Kristine Larsen, in 2017, devotes a chapter of her The Women Who Popularized Geology in the 19th Century to Welsh; she notes: "Reconstructing [Welsh's] history ... has taken concerted effort and yielded limited, if not fascinating, results, many of which are described here for the first time".

Welsh was also one of just six women who were primary authors of works among the 1465 authors noted by Curtis P. Schuh in his Mineralogy & Crystallography: An Annotated Biobibliography of Books Published 1469 Through 1919.

== Selected publications ==
- Welsh, Jane Kilby (1832–1833). Familiar lessons in mineralogy and geology : designed for the use of young persons and lyceums : in two volumes. Boston: Clapp & Hull.
- A botanical catechism : containing introductory lessons for students in botany. By a lady. Northampton, Massachusetts: T.W. Shepard and Co. 1819.
