= Mary Townsend (entomologist) =

American entomologist and author (1814–1851)

- Townsend, date unspecified
- Born: May 14, 1814; Philadelphia, Pennsylvania
- Died: July 8, 1851 (aged 37); Philadelphia, Pennsylvania
- Occupation: Writer
- Years active: 1844-1851

Mary Townsend (May 14, 1814 – July 8, 1851) was an early American science writer and abolitionist. Born into a prominent Philadelphia Quaker family, she, her parents, and her siblings were educated at the Westtown School. From childhood, Townsend had an interest in insects. She conducted various studies and experiments, examining specimens under a microscope and evaluating their habits. Because illness and the loss of her sight kept her confined to her bed, Townsend taught herself how to write with a braille-like card. In 1844, she published Life in the Insect World: or, Conversations upon Insects, between an Aunt and Her Nieces, which became popular and influential, particularly in influencing other women to pursue science.

With her sister Hannah, she also wrote The Anti-Slavery Alphabet, which was published in 1846. Aimed at a juvenile audience, the work taught children the alphabet, using words that would help them develop both a political consciousness and an understanding of human rights. It was sold at anti-slavery fairs to raise money for the abolition movement. Between 1847 and 1851, Townsend worked on a history of England for children, told in rhymes. The work was not published prior to her death in 1851.

== Early life and education ==
Mary Townsend was born on May 14, 1814, in Philadelphia, Pennsylvania to Priscilla (née Kirk) and Charles Townsend. Priscilla, a Quaker, originally from York, Pennsylvania, attended Westtown School in West Chester. In 1803, she married Charles Townsend, of Chester County, Pennsylvania. Charles had also attended Westtown School, as did the couple's children. He was a druggist and watchmaker in Philadelphia and the couple were members of the Green Street Friends Meeting, for which Priscilla served as a minister. The family lived at 105 Chestnut Street until 1822. Their home was adjacent to Franklin Court, the home of Benjamin Franklin in his later years.

In 1823, the family moved to 138 South Tenth Street. They were well-off, but not wealthy, influential in the community, and well-educated. When the Hicksite Separation occurred in 1827, the family sided with the new sect. Although Charles and Priscilla were quietists, they did not object to their children's involvement in reform movements. In 1833, the family would be among the founders of the Spruce Street Friends Meeting. The couple had twelve children, although five died in infancy. The seven surviving children were: Elisha (1804–1858), Edward (1806–1896), Charles (1807–1866), John Kirk (1809–1851), Hannah (1812–1851), Mary (1814–1851), and Elizabeth (1824–1869).

Townsend was prone to illness and often was confined to her bed. According to Barbara and Richard Mearns, naturalists who wrote John Kirk Townsend: Collector of Audubon's Western Birds and Mammals, she had tumors in her uterus, which caused recurring problems. She also eventually lost her sight, and taught herself how to write using an "indented card" (braille), even if her eyes were bandaged. From an early age, she was interested in the behavior of insects. Additionally, influenced by members such as Lucretia Mott, who attended the Green Street Friends Meeting, the Townsend daughters became anti-slavery activists. Townsend became an intimate friend of Graceanna Lewis and the women exchanged letters indicating their close bond.

== Career ==
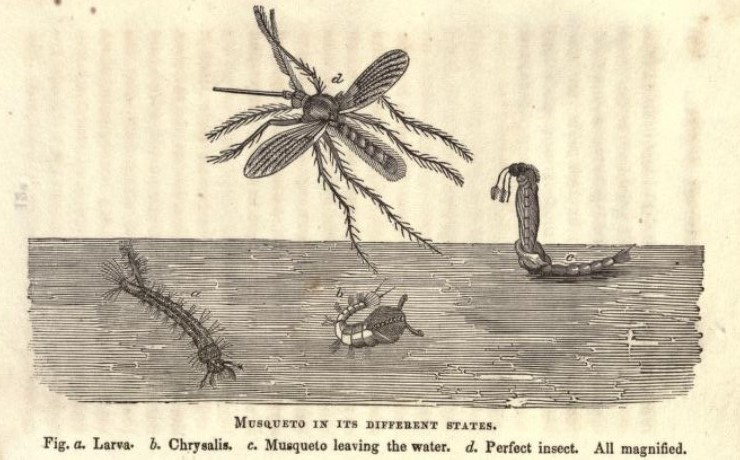
"Mosquitoes", drawing by Townsend from page 134 of her book Life in the Insect World

During one of the periods when Townsend was confined, she wrote Life in the Insect World in 1844. Although it was published anonymously, Lewis wrote to Phebe Hanaford that Townsend was the author and had inspired her to undertake similar studies about nature. Lewis said that she wanted to write "a little work [on birds] as a companion to that of my friend". The book presented common insects, such as ants, bees, beetles, butterflies, crickets, fireflies, fleas, katydids, locusts, mosquitos, silkworms, spiders, termites, and wasps with descriptions of their appearance and behavior. Written in twenty chapters, the material gave details about the social organization of ants, the life cycles of butterflies, and the use of other insects as food, among other descriptions. These discussions were accompanied by illustrations, which confirmed that she was familiar with the use of microscopes. It is also clear from the texts that in addition to observation, she read materials prepared by other entomologists, and conducted experiments with various insects, as Townsend noted how she studied their eating habits and sounds they produced.

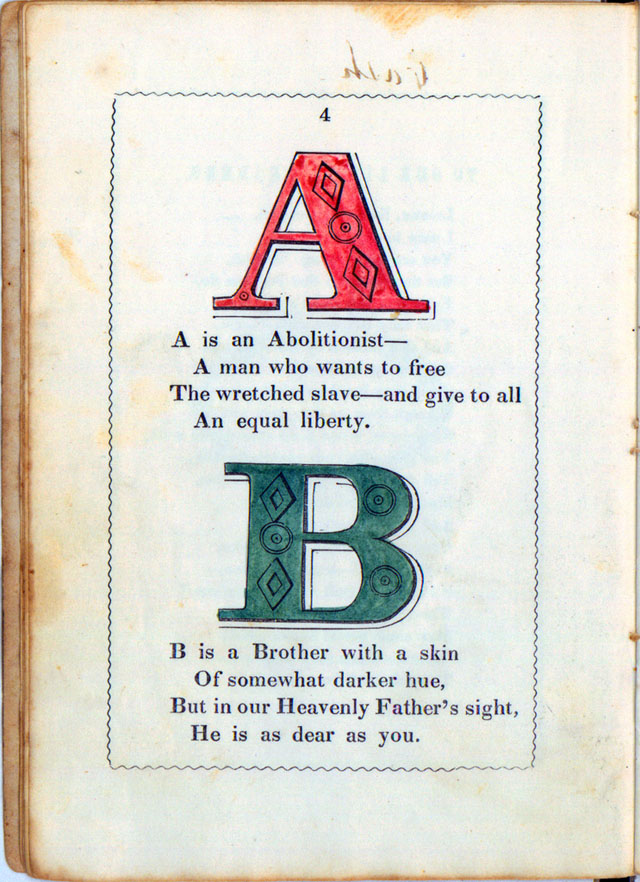
Anti-Slavery Alphabet 1846, page 4

Along with her older sister, Hannah, Townsend published The Anti-Slavery Alphabet in 1846 for the Philadelphia Female Anti-Slavery Society's fair that year. It was first published anonymously, but the author's were disclosed in the January 29, 1847, edition of The Liberator, an anti-slavery newspaper published by William Lloyd Garrison. The book was aimed at teaching children that they could also be activists in the abolition movement, by teaching their friends and avoiding purchases of goods that promoted the slave trade. The book was written in a way to encourage the development of political consciousness and a basic understanding of human rights. In the book, each letter of the alphabet was demonstrated by a word related to slavery, so for example "A" stood for "abolitionist", whereas "B" represented "brothers", indicating that slaves were part of humankind. It was reprinted in 1847 and distributed at anti-slavery fairs as a fundraising publication.

Near the end of her life, Townsend was writing with a "younger sister" a children's book giving a rhymed account of England's history. Fredrika Bremer discusses the writing of this book during her 1847 to 1851 journey to America, and says that she had visited Townsend. Bremer noted that although Townsend was unable to read or write because of her progressive eye problems, she was able to dictate her work. (Note: Hannah, Townsend's older sister, was credited as the sole author of History of England, in Verse, from the Invasion of Julius Cæsar to the Present Time, which was published posthumously in 1852.)

== Death and legacy ==
Townsend died on July 8, 1851, in Philadelphia, five months after her brother John died and ten days prior to her sister Hannah's death. She was buried in the Woodlands, where Hannah would also be buried. Townsend's book on insects was influential, not only upon Lewis' choice of career, but also was praised by Swedish writer, Bremer, who noted that the book was written in such a way that it created a "biographic and poetic manner" likely to encourage girls to take up the study of insects. Her accomplishments were mostly forgotten until Elizabeth Wagner Reed wrote American Women in Science before the Civil War to recover the history of twenty-two American women who had published scientific papers in the Antebellum Period. The Townsend family papers remain privately owned; however, a descendant of the family, Dana Dunbar Howe, has published multiple volumes of their works. The third volume, published in 2018, contains some of Mary's papers in parts two and four, Hannah, Mary, and Elizabeth: Poems and Letters circa 1840–1851 and Mary Townsend: Life in the Insect World, 1844.

== Selected works ==
- Townsend, Mary (1844). Life in the Insect World: or, Conversations upon Insects, between an Aunt and Her Nieces. Philadelphia, Pennsylvania: Lindsay & Blakiston. OCLC 6503099.
- Townsend, Hannah; Townsend, Mary (1846). The Anti-Slavery Alphabet. Philadelphia, Pennsylvania: Philadelphia Female Anti-Slavery Society. OCLC 912785864. (revised, 1847)
