= Sheldon C. Reed =

American geneticist

Sheldon Clark Reed
- Born: November 7, 1910; Barre, Vermont, US
- Died: January 1, 2003 (aged 92); Minneapolis, Minnesota, US
- Education: Dartmouth College (BA), Harvard University (PhD)
- Known for: Genetic Counseling
- Scientific career
- Fields: Biology; Genetic Counseling; Human Genetics; Behavior Genetics
- Workplaces: University of Minnesota
- Doctoral advisor: William E. Castle

Sheldon Clark Reed (November 7, 1910 – February 1, 2003) was an American biologist and geneticist who coined the term genetic counseling and advocated for the wider use of genetic counseling as a means to educate the public.

== Education ==
Reed was born in Barre, Vermont on November 7, 1910. He graduated from Montpelier High School in 1928. In 1932, he received his Bachelor of Arts degree in biology from Dartmouth College. While at Dartmouth, he work with George Davis Snell of Brown University to research harelip in mice; their work was published in 1932. He attended Harvard University for graduate school where he performed research under William E. Castle, studying mammal mutations including harelip. He published nine more research papers at Harvard and received his PhD in biology in 1935.

== Career ==
Reed performed research in labs at the University of Chicago, McGill University where he studied development in mice, and Harvard University, where he studied the relationship between fruit fly genetics and behavior. In 1942 Reed participated in WWII by using his background to assist in statistical research as well as interrogation of German scientists.

In 1947, Reed began working at the University of Minnesota as the director of the Dight Institute for Human Genetics. While working at the Dight Institute, Reed coined the term “genetic counseling” as a way to describe advice he and his colleagues were giving to physicians in relation to genetic diseases such as Huntington disease, intellectual disability, and cleft palate. In particular, he used this terminology to distance his work from terminology such as genetic hygiene, which he viewed as being overly associated with cleanliness products like toothpaste.

In his writings on genetic counseling, Reed strongly emphasized the importance of respect for his clients, and his approach to counseling has since been regarded as being similar to that of psychologists. In 1956, Reed became president of the American Society of Human Genetics. That same year, he would release Counseling in Modern Genetics, a book designed to present the concept of genetics and advice related to genetics in a manner that the typical family could comprehend.

In 1956, Reed attended the first International Congress of Human Genetics, where he introduced and promoted the idea of genetic counseling.

Though Reed never acquired a formal medical degree, he personally participated in over 4000 cases of genetic counseling. Reed retired from academic studies in 1978 and died on February 1, 2003, at the age of 93.

== Personal life ==
Reed married Elizabeth Wagner Beasley in 1946 after her husband, an acquaintance of Reed, died in WWII. He would have two more children in addition to the child that Beasley had by her first marriage. Beasley, an associate professor of biology herself, was the research partner of Reed and jointly authored numerous publications with him. Her pioneering work in genetics was obscured by his more prominent position, although he acknowledged her partnership in their work. While he was the director of the Dight Institute, she was provided a desk to work, but not listed as staff of the institute, where she worked for over fifteen years. Reed enjoyed breeding violets and orchids during his retirement and also helped Hmong immigrants learn English and other skills necessary to succeed in America.
