= Eunice Powers Cutter =

American teacher and abolitionist

- Born: Eunice Nye Powers; October 16, 1819; Warren, Massachusetts
- Died: May 10, 1893 (aged 73); Warren, Massachusetts
- Other name: E. P. Cutter
- Occupations: Teacher, abolitionist, and writer
- Years active: 1843-1880s
- Spouse: Calvin Cutter (m. 1843)
- Children: 2

Eunice Powers Cutter (October 16, 1819 – May 10, 1893) was an American teacher, who was active in the Abolistionist movement, and wrote one of the most popular children's textbooks on anatomy in the Antebellum period. She was born in Massachusetts and educated there and in Connecticut before becoming a teacher in 1843. After her marriage, she assisted her husband in writing university-level anatomy textbooks. She presented lectures on hygiene to women's groups and community gatherings through the mid-1850s and published textbooks on anatomy aimed at grammar school children. In 1856 or 1857, the family moved to Kansas and participated with John Brown in the efforts to ensure that Kansas Territory entered the union as a free state.

Returning from Kansas at the start of the Civil War, Cutter organized Soldier's Aid Society throughout Massachusetts to outfit soldiers and provide hospital supplies for field hospitals. Her husband and step-daughter served in the hospital corps during the war. When the war ended, she assisted her husband in revising his anatomy textbooks and continued with that task after his death in 1872. In 1879, she wrote a history of Warren, Massachusetts and in the 1880s wrote histories of Worcester County. She died in 1898 and was remembered mainly for her abolitionist work in Kansas until 1992, when Elizabeth Wagner Reed recovered her contributions to science.

== Early life and education ==
Eunice Nye Powers was born on October 16, 1819, in Warren, Massachusetts to Eunice (née Haskell) and Chester Powers. Her father manufactured woolen products. Powers' mother died when she was young and her father entrusted her education to an older brother, Daniel. After studying in Monson, Westfield, and New Haven, Connecticut, she returned to Warren and became the precept of the Quaboag Seminary in 1843. (Note: Abolitionist and women's right's activist, Lucy Stone attended Monson Academy in 1841 and then Quaboag Seminary in 1842.) On December 10, she married the physician Calvin Cutter, a widower, whose first wife, Caroline Hall, a daughter of Nathan Hall (or Nathaniel), had died in August 1842, shortly after giving birth to a daughter, Carrie. (Note: Caroline's gravestone reads "Caroline H., wife of Calvin Cutter, M. D., Murdered by the Baptist Ministry and Baptist Churches as follows:--September 28, 1838 Æt. 33. She was accused of lying in Church Meeting…" Her actual death is reported in the Boston Globe as having occurred on August 1, 1842, after having given birth on July 28, 1842, to Carrie.) The couple would have two sons together, John Clarence and Walter Powers Cutter, though Walter died at the age of fourteen in 1871.

== Career and activism ==
Between 1848 and 1857, Cutter traveled with her husband and lectured to various women's groups throughout New England about health. He lectured on anatomy, physiology, and hygiene to schools and colleges in thirty states during the same period. Calvin published a textbook Anatomy and Physiology in 1846, which was reprinted fifteen times before being revised in 1848 and 1852 with the assistance of his wife. Cutter published her first book, Human and Comparative Physiology in the early 1850s. (Note: Reed noted that Nietz gives the date of 1854 for Eunice Cutter's first book, but states that the first book is undated and that the 1854 is a "stereotyped school edition". Wright indicates a slightly different name of the earliest text.) Whereas her husband published works for university-level students, Cutter's book was aimed at children. Hiram A. Wright, the Superintendent of Public Instruction of Wisconsin described the book as "of the highest importance" for introduction to common schools for twelve year old pupils, to enable students to learn about their own bodies, function of organs, and proper hygiene. It was revised as Human and Comparative Anatomy, Physiology, and Hygiene in 1854 and reprinted in 1855. The book was divided into four parts, including in part one the circulatory, digestive, respiratory and vocal systems; in part two, the nervous system; in part three, the bones, muscles, and skin; and in part four, a question and answer review. The New York Evangelist described it as a concise, illustrated outline of the basic principles of health and the body, which was clearly presented and useful for schools.

Cutter and her family moved to Kansas in 1857 and were active in the American abolitionist movement. Friends of John Brown, they were in favor of Kansas entering the union as a free state. Newspapers reported through the 1930s that Cutter had made cartridges for the Battle of Osawatomie. The battle took place on August 30, 1856, and while some sources specify that though Calvin was there in 1856 and she did not go to Kansas until the Spring of 1857, others show she was there in 1856. During their time in Kansas, she wrote dispatches, including a lengthy article "The Missouri River Pirates", which was first published in the Worcester Spy on July 19, 1856, and reprinted in the National Anti-Slavery Standard. After Kansas was admitted as a free state in January 1861, she delivered the news to colleagues in Chicago and then returned to Massachusetts.

As the Civil War had broken out, Cutter organized branches of the Soldier's Aid Society throughout Massachusetts. With her step-daughter, Carrie, they outfitted soldiers and provided all of the hospital supplies for the expedition led by brigadier general Thomas W. Sherman to secure Fort Walker on Hilton Head Island and then fully equipped the 21st Massachusetts Infantry Regiment. Calvin joined the 21st Infantry as the regimental surgeon, in October 1861 and prepared to sail with the Burnside's North Carolina Expedition to blockade the ports of the Outer Banks coastline. Carrie petitioned to remain with her father and was allowed to stay with him at the United States Naval Academy in Annapolis, Maryland and then serve aboard the SS Northern, which was headed to Roanoke Island. When the Battle of Roanoke Island commenced, she assisted him in caring for the wounded. The regiment engaged again at the Battle of New Berne in March 1862. Carrie again treated the wounded, but contracted typhoid fever and died on April 24, 1862.

While her husband and stepdaughter were at the front, Cutter continued her work with the Soldier's Aid Society, until news of Carrie's death reached her and she withdrew from the work. In June 1863, Calvin experienced severe heat stroke, which caused him continuing health problems. He resigned his post after the Battle of Spotsylvania Court House in 1864, and returned home. Thereafter, the couple engaged in updating Calvin's popular textbook, which was published as New Analytic Anatomy, Physiology and Hygiene in 1870.

After 1871, Cutter took full charge of the revisions of Calvin's work, with assistance from her son John who was studying to become a physician. Calvin died in 1872, but the New Analytic Anatomy, Physiology and Hygiene was revised, and republished by J. B. Lippincott & Co., in 1871, 1873, and 1874. According to John A. Nietz, a professor at the University of Pittsburgh, the Cutters' textbooks were "the most widely used" school books prior to 1900, primarily because they updated them often and they were easy to use both for students and teachers. In 1879, Cutter published a history of the town of Warren and the following year began working on two histories of Worcester County, which were published after 1880.

== Death and legacy ==
Cutter died on May 10, 1893, at Warren, Massachusetts. For decades after her death she was primarily remembered for her involvement with John Brown's anti-slave campaigns in Kansas. When her son John died, he donated land in the town of Warren to be established as a memorial children's park in the memory of his entire family. Her contributions to science were forgotten until the twentieth century, when geneticist Elizabeth Wagner Reed recovered the histories of twenty-two women who published scientific works prior to the Civil War in her book, American Women in Science before the Civil War (1992).

== Works ==
- Cutter, Eunice P. (n.d.). Human and Comparative Physiology. Warren, Massachusetts: n.s.
- Cutter, Eunice P. (1854). Human and Comparative Anatomy, Physiology, and Hygiene (stereotyped school ed.). New York, New York: Clark, Austin and Smith. OCLC 10706176. (revised 1855)
- Cutter, Eunice P. (1879). "Warren". In Marvin, Abijah P. (ed.). History of Worcester County, Massachusetts, Embracing a Comprehensive History of the County From Its First Settlement to the Present Time, With a History and Description of Its Cities and Towns. Vol. 2: L-Z. Boston, Massachusetts: C.F. Jewett & Co. pp. 437–455. OCLC 1804192.
