= Jane Taylor (singer) =

- Born: 19 July 1972 (age 54); Bristol, UK
- Education: Keele University
- Occupation: Singer
- Musical career
- Genres: Folk
- Instruments: Guitar; Piano
- Years active: 2003–present
- Website: janetaylor.co.uk

Jane Taylor (born 19 July 1972) is an English singer-songwriter.

== Early releases and music career ==
Jane Taylor was born and raised in Bristol where she wrote her first album Montpelier. Initially, the album was not released or signed to a label, but rather Taylor performed her songs locally. The album was later released after Taylor met the former director of BMG Publishing, Johnny Stirling while performing at the Kashmir Klub in London. Stirling linked Taylor with the award-winning songwriter Bill Lovelady, who provided a studio in Oxford where the Montpelier album was recorded. Once the album was completed, Taylor mailed a copy to the BBC Radio 2 studios in the hope that it would be received and broadcast.

In 2005, Johnnie Walker played the song "Fall On Me" live on BBC Radio 2, resulting in Taylor securing a distribution label and a manager. She later went on to support the likes of Jools Holland, Bill Wyman and Seth Lakeman, as well as touring with Paul Buchanan. The album's song "Blowing This Candle Out" later went on to win the UK Songwriting Contest 2003.

Her second album Compass was released in 2009, and came entirely from support from fans and was produced alongside Mercury nominated producer Colin Elliot. The album featured a full string orchestra and was accompanied by the Bristol Gospel Choir.

Taylor released her third full album All the Colours in 2022 to celebrate 20 years since the writing of her first songs and the Montpelier album. The album was recorded by the Jane Taylor Band in Sheffield in February 2022, alongside producers Colin Elliot and Lizz Lipscombe. The band also released the single "All Things Change" accompanied with its own music video for the Gratitude Festival for NHS Volunteers in Frome, Somerset where the music video was filmed.

== Personal life ==
Jane Taylor lives with her family in Frome, Somerset where she runs the Mells Choir, teaching guitar and piano lessons for the local community.

== Discography ==
=== Albums ===
Title	Year	Songs
Montpelier	2006	1. Fall on Me; 2. My Street; 3. Hit the Ground; 4. 16 Points; 5. Chef Mirror; 6. Mirror; 7. Blowing This Candle Out; 8. Landslide; 9. Feels Good; 10. Brother; 11. Getting to Me
Compass	2009	1. Cracks; 2. Hallelujah; 3. Old Friends; 4. All Things Change; 5. Compass; 6. Home; 7. I'm Fine; 8. Lay Down Your Sword; 9. Where Is Your Grace; 10. I Will Get There
All the Colours	2022	1. The Light; 2. Something is Poisoning the Water; 3. Blazing Trail; 4. Let It All Out; 5. Stop; 6. One and the Same; 7. I Will Run to You; 8. Winter; 9. Silent Year; 10. I Will Soar

=== Singles ===
Title	Year
"Oh December"	2009
"Violet"	2009
"Angels Sing"	2012
"All The Saints"	2020
"All Things Change"	2022

== Awards and nominations ==
Year	Award	Category	Work	Result
2003	UK Songwriting Contest	Overall & Pop	"Blowing This Candle Out"	Won
2010	Independent Music Awards	Best Folk/Singer Songwriter	Compass	Won
