= Mary Amelia Swift =

American teacher and textbook writer

- Born: September 17, 1812; Winchester, Litchfield County, Connecticut
- Died: November 1, 1875 (aged 63); Elizabeth, Union County, New Jersey
- Other names: Mary A. Swift
- Occupation(s): Educator, writer
- Notable work: First Lessons on Natural Philosophy

Mary Amelia Swift (September 17, 1812 – November 1, 1875) was an American teacher and textbook writer. Little is known of her early life, though she was raised in western and central Connecticut. In 1833, she became the principal of the Litchfield Female Academy, leading the school for three years. That year, noting a need to teach basic science and finding no adequate textbooks, she wrote First Lessons on Natural Philosophy–Part First. It was one of the first scientific texts written by a woman and was based on her observations of teaching needs from her classroom experience. Three years later she wrote a more advanced textbook for older children, First Lessons on Natural Philosophy–Part Second.

Marrying in 1845, Swift moved to Brooklyn and raised a family. She revised her books frequently and they were republished at least thirty-five times gaining popularity thanks to their easy-to-use format. Distributed throughout the United States, Swift's books were also used in Canada and England, though the British version did not credit her as the author. The books were translated into three Asian languages — Burmese, Japanese, and S'gaw Karen — featuring among the earliest textbooks translated for use in developing countries. As one of them was used in Burma, now Myanmar, in the 1850s, many students there were introduced to elementary physics before European students. The books remained in print through the turn of the century.

== Early life and education ==
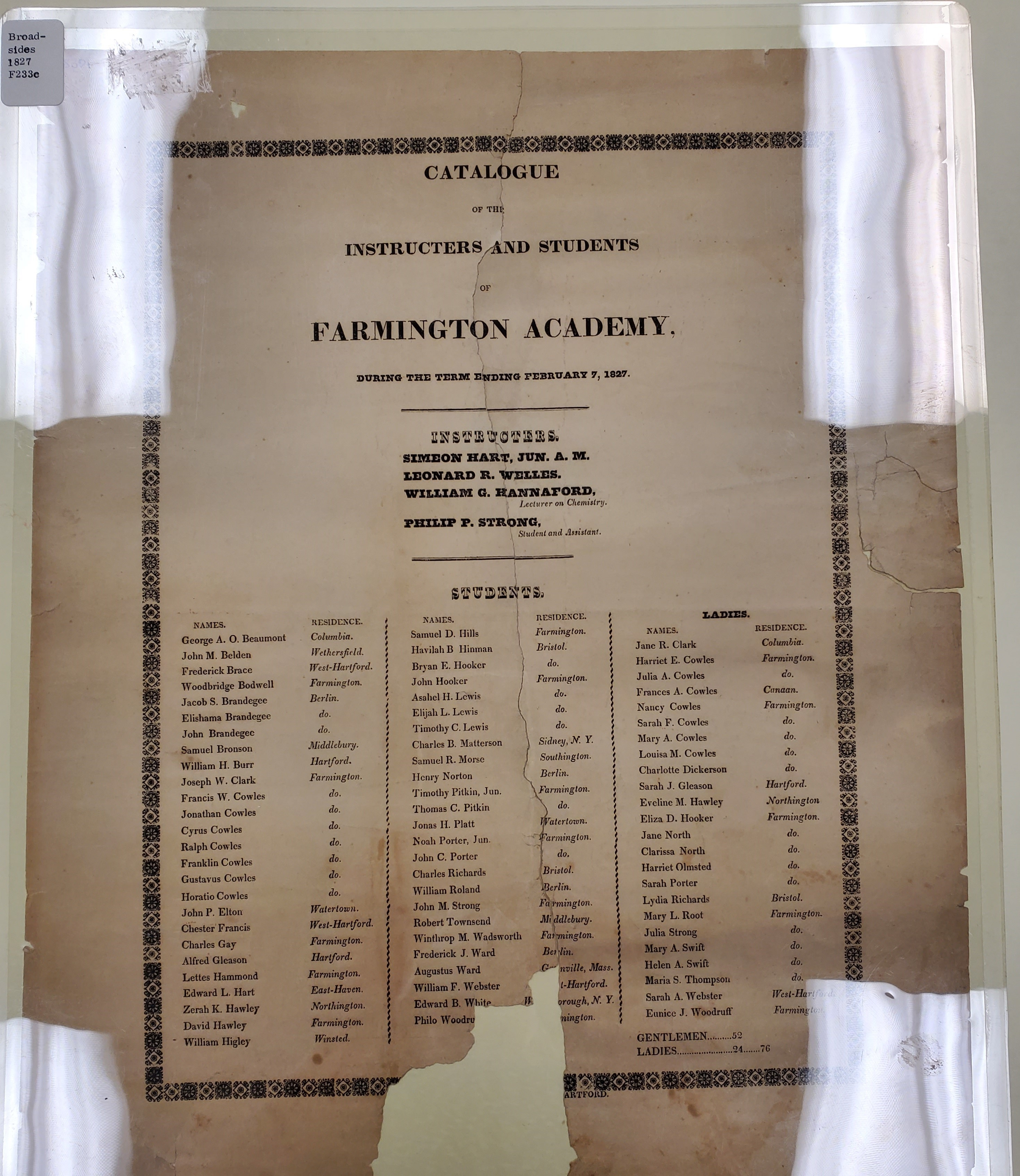
A student roster from the Old Farmington Academy for the 1827 term confirms Mary A. and Helen attended the school.

Mary Amelia Swift was born on September 17, 1812, in Winchester, Litchfield County, Connecticut, to Nellye (Nellie, Nelly) Minerva (née Everitt or Everett) and Zephaniah Swift. (Note: Palmer noted that Allibone's Dictionary (1871), Appletons' Cyclopædia of American Biography (1889), and the Encyclopedia of Connecticut Biography (1917), all link Mary A. Swift, the author to judge Zephaniah Swift (1759–1823). Allibone's Critical Dictionary, (1882) does not list Mary in the judge's entry, but separately lists her as "daughter of Zephaniah Swift LL.D.", without giving any biographical dates. Appletons' Cyclopædia (1889) states at the bottom of the judge's entry "His daughter Mary A., published about 1833 'First Lessons on Natural Philosophy…'", and again gives no biographical dates. Palmer's review included published genealogies and he noted that biographical dictionaries recorded Swift as the daughter of the judge, but the genealogies indicated that she was the daughter of Zephaniah Swift (1786–1834), and it was possible that later works relied on Allibone, who could have been in error. The judge was born in Massachusetts and moved as a child to Lebanon, Connecticut, in the eastern part of the state. His family later relocated to Windham County in eastern Connecticut. His will, dated August 24, 1823, shows his wife, Lucretia, and children — Henry, George, Edward, Lucretia, Emily, Lucian, and Julia — as beneficiaries. Zephaniah the physician, lived in western and central Connecticut, and his daughter was living at the time the books were first written (1833), when she joined the membership with her mother and sister at the Second Church in Hartford in 1835.) She was baptized on November 1, 1812, at the Canton Center Congregational Church. Her mother was the daughter of Dr. Josiah Everitt, first doctor in Winchester and an American Revolutionary War soldier. Nellye grew up in Winchester, attending the local schools. She married Zephaniah, fifth child of Deborah (née Clark) and Daniel Swift, who was from Lebanon, Connecticut, on September 17, 1811. They made their home in Winchester, where he worked as a physician and their first two daughters, Mary and Helen, were born. Around 1817, Harriet was born in Farmington in Hartford County, followed by the births of Solomon, Charles, Louise, Catherine, and Zephaniah Jr. Swift and her sister Helen attended the Old Farmington Academy in both 1827 and 1828. (Note: William Palmer, a former professor and a Fellow of the Royal Australian Chemical Institute, evaluated the record of the Litchfield Female Academy and the Hartford Female Seminary because he found a letter from Harriet Beecher Stowe to her school friend Mary Swift. Harriet attended the Litchfield Academy from 1821 and the Hartford Seminary from 1824, but no record was identified about Swift at either school, according to Palmer.) This school was built in Farmington in 1816 by the Congregational Church and allowed both boys and girls to enroll. Zephaniah served as a deacon at the church in Farmington. After 1829, the family moved to Bristol, where he died in 1834, after an accident when he was thrown from his wagon and sustained a head injury.

== Career ==
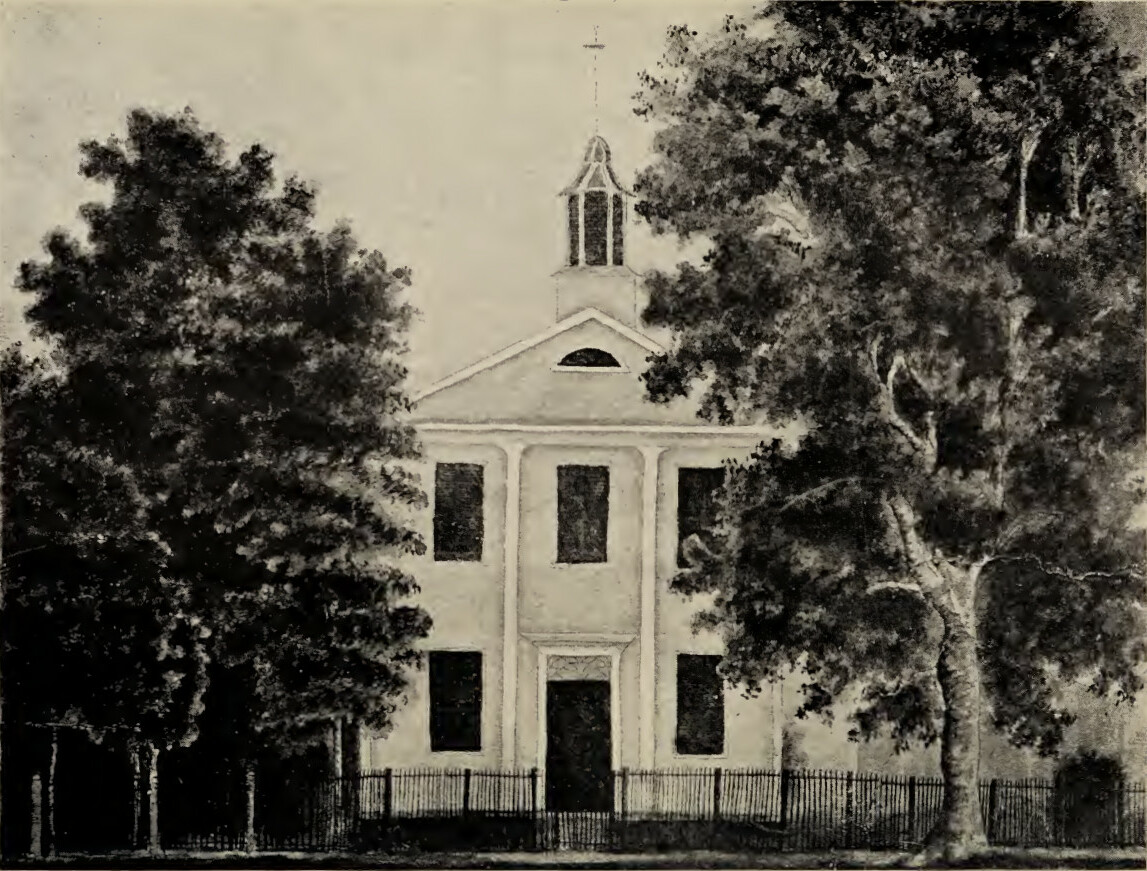
The Litchfield Female Academy, watercolor by J. Napoleon Gimbrede, ca. 1830

In 1833, Swift became the principal of the Litchfield Female Academy. She may have jointly worked there with her sister Helen, who was also a teacher. While working there, Swift wrote First Lessons in Natural Philosophy–Part First, because she was dissatisfied with the textbooks in use at the school, writing that they were not "suited to [children's] capacity". She continued teaching at the academy until 1836, although in 1835, Nellye, Mary and Helen moved to Hartford and joined the Second Church of that city. In 1836, Swift published First Lessons on Natural Philosophy for Children–Part Second and Poor but Happy, or, the Villagers of Ban de la Roche and the Children of Icolumbkill. She may also have taught in New York. (Note: Palmer assumed Swift taught in New York prior to Litchfield and noted her as being a "fine Greek scholar", who was able to write well in both modern Greek and Greek script. An 1838 newspaper clipping from The Long-Island Star shows a Miss Swift engaged to teach at the Saltonstall's Boarding and Day School in Brooklyn, who had "highest classical education".)

On November 6, 1845, in Staten Island, Swift married her first cousin, Henry Augustus Swift. Henry was the son of Abigail (née Jesup) and the lawyer Eliphalet Swift (fourth child of Deborah née Clark and Daniel Swift), and grew up in Westport, Connecticut. Henry was a dry goods merchant in New York and the couple made their home in Brooklyn. They had six children – Abby Jesup (August 24, 1846 – July 11, 1870), Henry John (September 28, 1847 – February 25, 1853), Mary Louisa (March 8, 1850 – November 15, 1858), Everett Mayhew (March 9, 1852 – March 19, 1940), Henrietta June (May 7, 1854 – August 6, 1854), and Annie Everett (August 20, 1857 – April 27, 1881) – all of whom died without having children. Henry died in New York City in 1870, and Swift remained there, living with her children, who were attending school.

== Written works ==
First Lessons about Natural Philosophy, for Children–Part First, 1837 edition

First Lessons on Natural Philosophy for Children–Part First was written in a question and answer format. It drew on natural philosophy to provide explanations of natural things, such as the properties of gases, liquids, and solids. The first part described the planets, the seasons, various weather conditions, and phenomena such as eclipses, and discussed forces like centripetal force, gravity, and inertia, to explain how they impacted bodies of matter. The book featured religious poems, psalms, and hymns, pictures, and a large typeface, aimed at demonstrating basic principles to children.

First Lessons on Natural Philosophy for Children–Part Second was an elementary physics textbook, for more advanced students, but retaining the question and answer format. It presented information on astronomy, geography, and physics, discussing such things as air pressure, electricity, friction, heat, light (absorbed, reflected, and refracted), motion, simple machines, and sound. Omitting the religious material in the earlier book, the format began with examples of things students might know, for example their home town, and then expanded to unknown territory, such as the Solar System. Illustrations were used as demonstrations of the ideas, using familiar objects, such as a teeter-totter as an example of a fulcrum or lever.

Poor but Happy, or, the Villagers of Ban de la Roche and the Children of Icolumbkill was a pious book written to encourage children to behave well and live useful lives. It gave an account of the life of John Frederick Oberlin and his labors to improve the lives of villagers in Ban de la Roche. Only one edition was printed of this book.

Both parts of First Lessons on Natural Philosophy for Children were successful and had multiple printings and revisions. Between 1833 and 1884, there were thirty-four editions or revisions of either one or both of the lessons printed by Belknap & Hamersley of Hartford, and a subsequent publishing by Brown & Gross of Hartford in 1890. The books were revised in 1859, to note advancements in knowledge and technology. They were substantially enlarged with the first part increasing from 104 pages in 1833 to 123 pages in 1859, and the second part increasing from 176 pages in 1839 to 215 pages in 1859. By 1862, her publishers were advertising that the books were sold in every state of the United States.

They also had an international audience and were sold in Canada through at least 1885. Palmer notes that Swift's books were plagiarized, published, and sold widely as his own work by Rev. T. Wilson, a pseudonym of Samuel Clarke (1810–1875), the Rector of Eaton Bishop in Herefordshire, England. Both parts were translated in 1846, into the S'gaw Karen language by Miranda Vinton, a missionary teacher. (Note: Palmer credits this translation to Mr. Vinton, citing Allibone. But, Allibone lists the translator as M. Vinton. Haskell for the Committee on the Library of Boston, shows that the translator was Miss M. Vinton, which the American Baptist Foreign Mission Society confirms was Miranda, sister of Justus Vinton.) They were translated in 1848, into Burmese by Lucretia Brownson Stilson, a missionary in Maulmain, Burma, and were subsequently reissued at least twice. They would also be used by the Japanese in the push to westernize the country which began in the 1850s. Fukuzawa Yukichi, published a book Kummo Kyuri Zukai (Illustration of Natural Science, 1872), which acknowledged that it was based in part upon Swift's books. That led to Japanese translations of her books.

== Death and legacy ==
Swift died on November 1, 1875, in Elizabeth, New Jersey, and was buried at the Evergreen Cemetery in Westport, Fairfield County, Connecticut. She is remembered as one of the earliest women to write scientific textbooks and as a teacher with classroom experience who tailored her work to meet pupils' needs, rather than following the lead of male science textbook writers, who had lacked similar experience. Swift's books made science easy to teach for those who were learning at home with parents, or who attended isolated schools led by inexperienced teachers. Palmer states of First Lessons on Natural Philosophy for Children that it "is the earliest record that I have found so far of a text book being translated for what would now be called 'the third world'" and that the translation into Burmese meant that students in Myanmar began studying physics earlier than many European students. He also noted the significance of the books in the modernization process of Japan.

== Selected works ==
- Swift, M. A. (1836). Poor but Happy, or, the Villagers of Ban de la Roche and the Children of Icolumbkill. Hartford, Connecticut: Belknap & Hamersley. OCLC 14972715.
- Swift, M. A. (1859a). First Lessons on Natural Philosophy for Children–Part First (revised ed.). Hartford, Connecticut: William James Hamersley. OCLC 48039608.
- Swift, M. A. (1859b). First Lessons on Natural Philosophy for Children (in two parts)–Part Second (revised ed.). Hartford, Connecticut: William James Hamersley. OCLC 606333261.
- Swift, M. A. (1874). ကလေးများအတွက် သဘာဝဒဿနဆိုင်ရာ ပထမသင်ခန်းစာများ (in Burmese). Translated by Stilson, L. B. (3rd ed.). Rangoon, Burma: n.s.
