= Jane Taylor (science writer) =

American children's textbook author

- Born: Jane Ellen Agnew; 1817–1820; New Jersey
- Died: 1904–1907 (age 87); New Brunswick, New Jersey
- Other names: Mrs. John Taylor
- Occupation: Science writer
- Years active: 1839–1860
- Notable work: Physiology for Children

Jane Taylor (c. 1817–1820 (Note: Per the 1860 census she was born ca. 1817. The 1870 census shows circa 1825 and the 1880 census shows 1820. As records indicate that the couple married in 1835 or 1836, the 1870 census is disregarded as an error, because the bride would have been ten years old.) — c. 1904–1907) (Note: Per the undated obituary found in Taylor, between two pages numbered 86, Jane Agnew Taylor was 87 years old at the time of her death.) was a pre-American Civil War writer of children's physiology books. Her works were widely distributed and provided instruction on basic anatomy, health maintenance and social etiquette.

== Early life and education ==
Jane Ellen Agnew was from New Brunswick, New Jersey. Her birth date varies on census records but fairly consistently report that she was ten years younger than her husband, J. Orville Taylor, who was born on May 14, 1807. The couple were married on November 16, 1835, or 1836. They had a son, Edward, born around 1850, who married and then died in 1880. Edward and his wife Lydia had a daughter Mary born that same year. Very little biographical information on her has surfaced, primarily because she was often confused with the English author Jane Taylor. Her obituary confirms that Jane Agnew Taylor was the author of Physiology for Children, as well as a contributor to other leading journals in New York.

== Career ==
Taylor began publishing educational books for children in 1830s. Orville was a proponent of developing professionalization of the teaching profession and advocated for standardized text books for public education. As the secretary of the American Common School Union and later the American Common School Society, he wrote, published, and sold educational textbooks. He filed the copyrights on Jane's works; under the law at that time, a wife could not appear in court or defend herself without her husband or a guardian's representation. She wrote The Girls School Book No. 1, as early as 1837, which her husband published, and was in its fourth edition by 1839. The book was described as a first reading primer for girls, teaching them proper behavior.

Beginning in the 1830s, discussions of anatomy and physiology became popular, and were increasingly seen as necessary information for women to know to maintain the health of their families. Women were expected to be able to transmit information to their children and other women about their bodies, excluding explicit sexual information. Catharine Beecher and Taylor began writing texts to relay basic information on the body, omitting discussion of sexual anatomy. These books focused on the benefits of good posture, physical education, diet, exercise, and proper moral behavior.

In 1839, Taylor published Physiology for Children, which would become her most popular work. (Note: Most sources show the author of the book to be Jane Taylor, but one newspaper clipping was found which confirmed the author as Mrs. John Taylor.) Following in the pattern of similar books by William Alcott, her texts were written in the style of a catechism and presented basic anatomy to children. They focused on various parts of the body, explaining their importance and structures in simple terms. For example, she described the spine as a structure "which runs from the head down the back, and is made up of twenty-four round pieces, like twenty-four rings piled one above the other", which were known as vertebrae. The book did not focus upon physiology or hygiene, until the fourth 1847 revision. It described different parts of the body and gave basic foundations for physiology, health care hints, as well as types of exercise and demonstrations of proper posture.

In 1848, Taylor revised the work and substantially expanded it under the title of Primary Lessons in Physiology for Children. The revision not only discussed anatomy and physiology but was aimed at presenting lessons on the body and its functions which legitimated the American social structure. For example, she depicted slaves and working-class people as more susceptible to disease, because they did not have the mental capacity to resist ailments and were likely to sink into "weakness and despair". Two subsequent editions were published in 1855 — one by George F. Cooledge and Brother and the other by Phinney & Co. — another edition was printed in 1856, and the final edition appeared in 1860.

Taylor's 1858 book, Wouldst Know Thyself!, or, The Outlines of Human Physiology gave more focus on behavior and hygiene giving tips on general health and care of the body as well as recommendations on clothing, diet, and exercise. The book had many illustrations giving examples of proper and improper body positions for optimal functioning. She avoided use of scientific names preferring common descriptions that her readers would understand. In this book, she also differentiated traits which separated humans from other animals. It was written in a question and answer format and was a condensed version of her earlier works. A second edition was published in 1860.

== Death and legacy ==
Taylor died on May 3, at the age of 87, at her home in New Brunswick, New Jersey. At the time of her death, she was remembered for her educational publications. In her lifetime, according to academic Elizabeth Wagner Reed, the books were very popular and seen as important works to "make children aware of the structure and functioning of their bodies". Though her biographical details were lost after Taylor's death, her work continued to be the subject of academic evaluation in both the 20th and 21st centuries.

== Works ==
- Taylor, Jane (1838). The Girls School Book No. 1. New York, New York: Common School Depository. OCLC 36531421.
- Taylor, Jane (1839). Physiology for Children. New York, New York: American Common School Society. OCLC 28592330.
- Taylor, Jane (1848). Primary Lessons in Physiology for Children. New York, New York: George G. Cooledge & Brother. OCLC 1289509487.
- Taylor, Jane (1858). Wouldst Know Thyself!, or, The Outlines of Human Physiology: Designed for the Use of Families and Schools. New York, New York: George G. Cooledge & Brother. OCLC 4316895.
