= The Anti-Slavery Alphabet =

1846 children's book

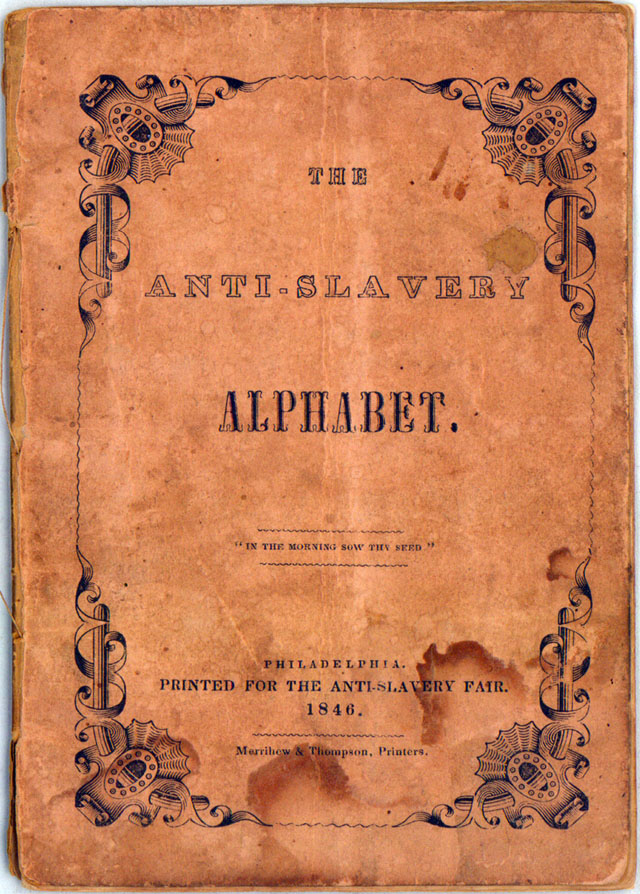
- Front cover
- Authors: Hannah Townsend and Mary Townsend
- Language: English
- Subject: Alphabet book
- Publisher: Philadelphia Female Anti-Slavery Society
- Publication date: 1846
- Publication place: United States
- Media type: Print

The Anti-Slavery Alphabet is an alphabet book published in 1846 by the Philadelphia Female Anti-Slavery Society (PFASS). It was written by two of the society's members, Hannah and Mary Townsend, with the intention of encouraging abolitionist ideas in young children.

== History ==
The Philadelphia Female Anti-Slavery Society was a local chapter of the American Anti-Slavery Society, a nationwide abolitionist organization. The society and its chapters produced a variety of anti-slavery literature for both adults and children. PFASS first released The Anti-Slavery Alphabet at their annual Anti-Slavery Fair in December 1846. The authors were not named on the cover, but were later identified as two Quaker women, Hannah Townsend (1812–1851) and her younger sister Mary Townsend (1814–1851). The sisters wrote the text and designed the woodcut illustrations of each letter. The intended audience was young children in households where the parents were already opposed to slavery.

The Philadelphia firm of Merrihew and Thompson printed the book on 16 leaves of paper, with printing on one side of each leaf. The pages were then hand-sewn into the covers, and the illustrations of each printed copy were hand-colored.

== Contents ==
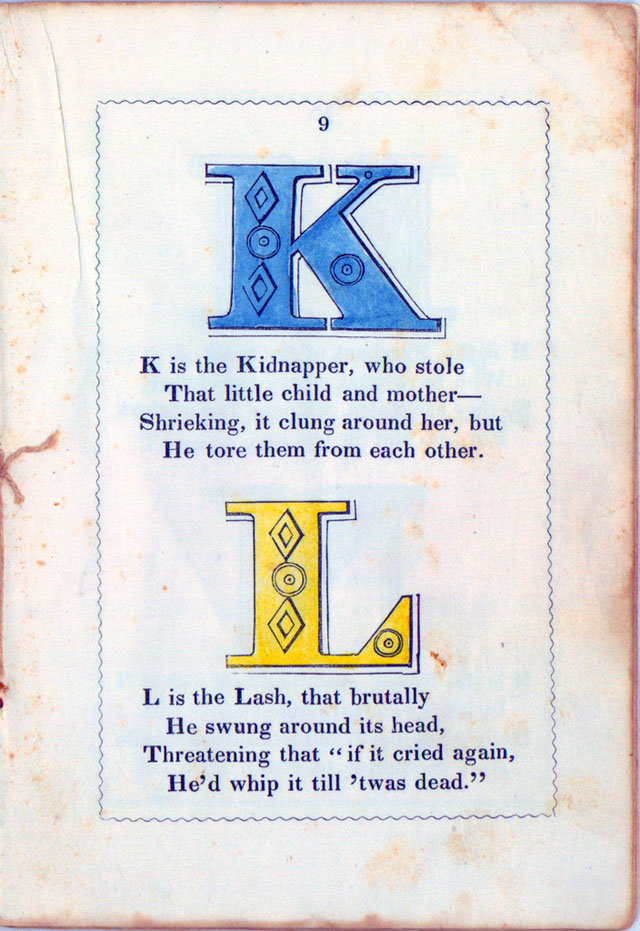
The page for the letters K and L focuses on the mistreatment of slaves.

The book is prefaced with a poem, "To Our Little Readers", that encourages readers to talk to other children and adults about ending slavery, and to refuse foods made with sugar, which was produced on plantations worked by slave labor. Each page of the main body of the book is illustrated with two decorated upper case letters of the English alphabet, in standard alphabetical order. After each letter is a rhyming quatrain discussing a word that begins with that letter. For example, the quatrain for the letter "A" is:

A is an Abolitionist—
A man who wants to free
The wretched slave—and give to all
An equal liberty.

The quatrains expose readers to abolitionist ideas and to problems with the treatment of slaves in the United States, such as the whipping of slaves and the separation of children from their mothers.

== See also ==
- The Slave's Friend, an anti-slavery magazine for children
