= Granville Penn =

British author and scriptural geologist

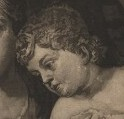
- Granville Penn as a child in a reproduction of a group portrait by Sir Joshua Reynolds
- Born: 9 December 1761
- Died: 28 September 1844
- Occupation: Writer
- Spouse: Isabella Forbes
- Children: William Granville
- Parents: Thomas Penn (father); Lady Juliana Fermor Penn (mother)
- Relatives: John Penn, Sophia Penn

Granville Penn FSA (9 December 1761 – 28 September 1844) was a British author, and scriptural geologist. He was a grandson of William Penn and a great-grandson of Admiral Sir William Penn.

== Biography ==
He was born 9 December 1761, in Spring Gardens, the second surviving son of Thomas Penn and his wife, Lady Juliana Fermor Penn, fourth daughter of Thomas, first Earl of Pomfret. He studied at Magdalen College, Oxford, but did not complete his degree. He then became an assistant clerk in the war department.

From 1788, Penn played a part in the development of veterinary education. A supporter of the Odiham Society, he met Charles Benoît Vial de Sainbel who was in England for the second time to try to set up a veterinary school, such as existed at Lyon; and whose profile was raised when he was asked to dissect the famous racehorse Eclipse. Penn ran a successful campaign over a few years to implement his own version of Sainbel's original scheme. The Veterinary College, London opened its doors to pupils at the beginning of 1792.

In 1834, Penn succeeded his brother, John Penn, in the estates of Stoke Park, Stoke Poges, Buckinghamshire, and Pennsylvania Castle, Portland. In 1836, he was elected as a member to the American Philosophical Society.

He died at Stoke Park, Buckinghamshire, on 28 September 1844, aged 82. In 1791, he had married Isabella, the eldest daughter of General Gordon Forbes at All Saints Church, Kingston upon Thames; they had four sons and five daughters, of whom two sons and three daughters survived to adulthood, though none of them left children. With the death without issue of the Rev. Thomas Gordon Penn (1803–1869), third son of Granville, the male line of descent from William Penn became extinct.

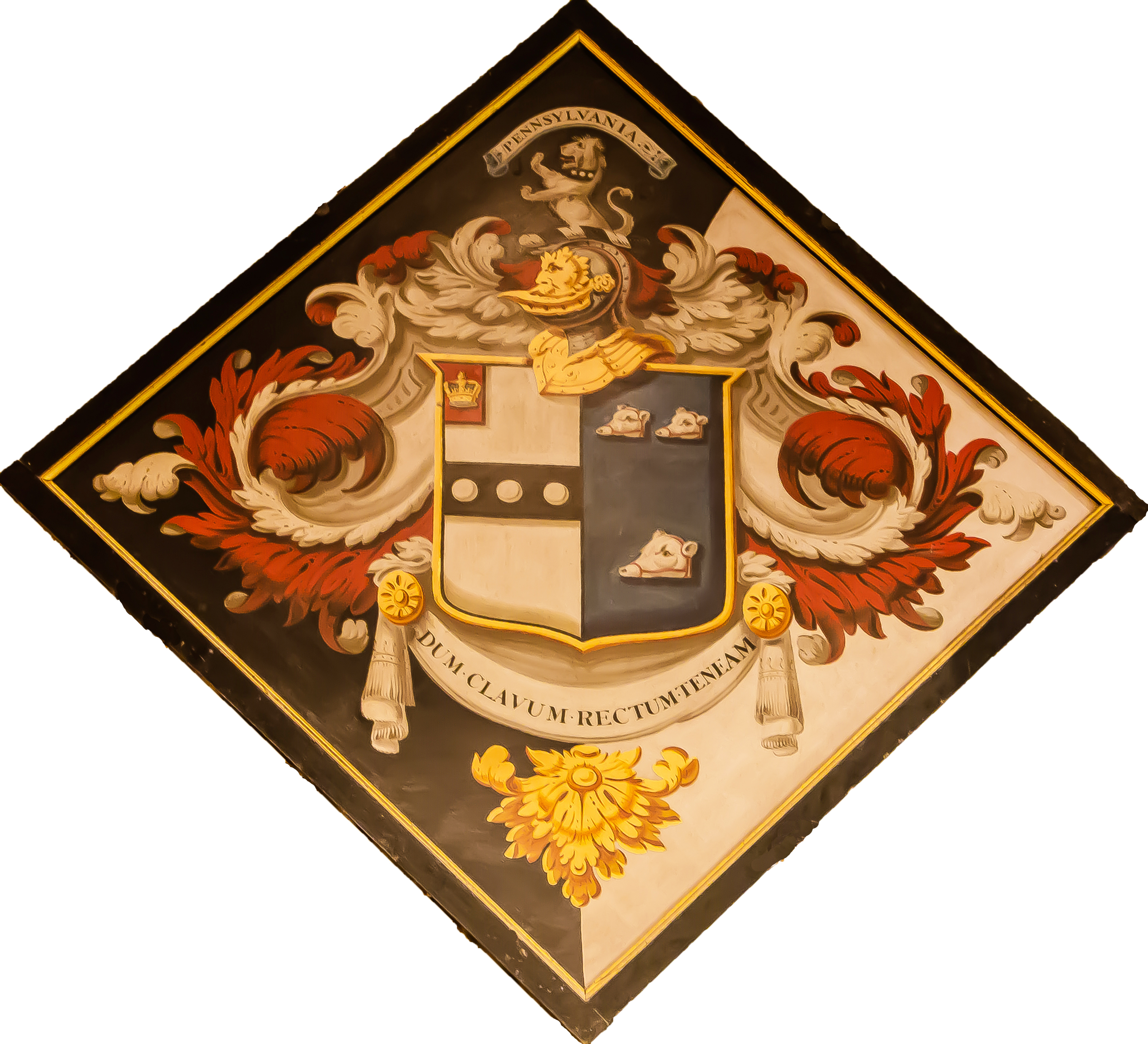
Funeral hatchment in Church of St Giles, Stoke Poges

== Writings ==
Penn, fluent in French, Greek, Latin and Hebrew, was a Fellow of the Society of Antiquaries and wrote several books dealing with Biblical criticism and published a number of competent translations of ancient Greek works, including a critical revision of the English version of the New Testament. He also wrote some theological works particularly related to Biblical chronology (past and future) and the early history of post-Flood mankind. In 1833 he wrote the Life of Admiral Sir William Penn, on his great-grandfather.

=== A Comparative Estimate ===
His major work as a scriptural geologist was A Comparative Estimate of the Mineral and Mosaical Geologies, published in 1822. Penn added a supplement in 1823 in response to Buckland's theory on Kirkdale Cave, and then revised and enlarged it to two volumes in 1825 in response to criticisms. Like most Scriptural geologists, Penn, whose name became indelibly associated with Scriptural geology, participated only transiently with it during his career. For example, between the production of his book when he was 62 and his death in 1844 he focused on philological scholarship.

==== Attitude toward geology ====
Penn wrote that "The science of Geology … has this remarkable character above all the preceding physical sciences; that, it not only conducts the intelligence, like them, to the discernment of the God of Nature, but advances it further, to a distinct recognition of that God of Nature in the God of Scripture".

== Arms ==
In 1838 Penn was granted arms to mark his descent from William Penn. The notice in The London Gazette said:

Whitehall, August 31, 1838.

The Queen has been pleased to grant unto Granville Penn, of Stoke park, in the county of Buckingham, Esq. grandson and heir male of William Penn, Esq. sometime proprietary and first settler of the province (now state) of Pennsvlvania, in North America, Her royal licence and permission, that he, and the other descendants of the said William Penn, may henceforth bear and use the armorial ensigns following, that is to say, "a fess charged with three plates, and, on a canton of honourable augmentation, a crown, representing the royal crown of King Charles the Second;" and for a crest, "a demi lion gorged with a collar, charged with: three plates, and above an escroll, thereon the word 'Pennsylvania;'" such armorial ensigns being first duly exemplified according to the laws of arms.

And also to command, that this Her Majesty's concession and especial mark of Her royal favour be registered in the College of Arms.

== Works ==
- Critical Remarks on Isaiah vii. 18, 1799.
- Remarks on the Eastern Origination of Mankind and of the Arts of Cultivated Life, 1799. Contained within William Ouseley's Oriental Collections.
- A Greek Version of the Inscription on the Rosetta Stone, containing a decree of the priests in honor of Ptolemy the Fifth, 1802.
- The Bioscope. Or Dial of Life, explained. To which is added, a Translation of St.Paulinu's Epistle to Celantia, on the Rule of Christian Life; and an Elementary View of General Chronology, 1814.
- A Comparative Estimate of the Mineral and Mosaical Geologies, 1822
- Conversations on Geology: Comprising a Familiar Explanation of the Huttonian and Wernian Systems: the Mosaic Geology (1828). Pages 293-315 deal with Penn's view of the Mosaic revelation in the form of a self-referential dialogue between 'Edward' and 'Mrs. R.'
- Life of Admiral Sir William Penn, 1833
- Annotations to the Book of the New Covenant (1836). A review and new translation of Johann Leonhard Hug's work.
