= Church of St Giles, Stoke Poges =

Church of England parish in Buckinghamshire

Church of St Giles
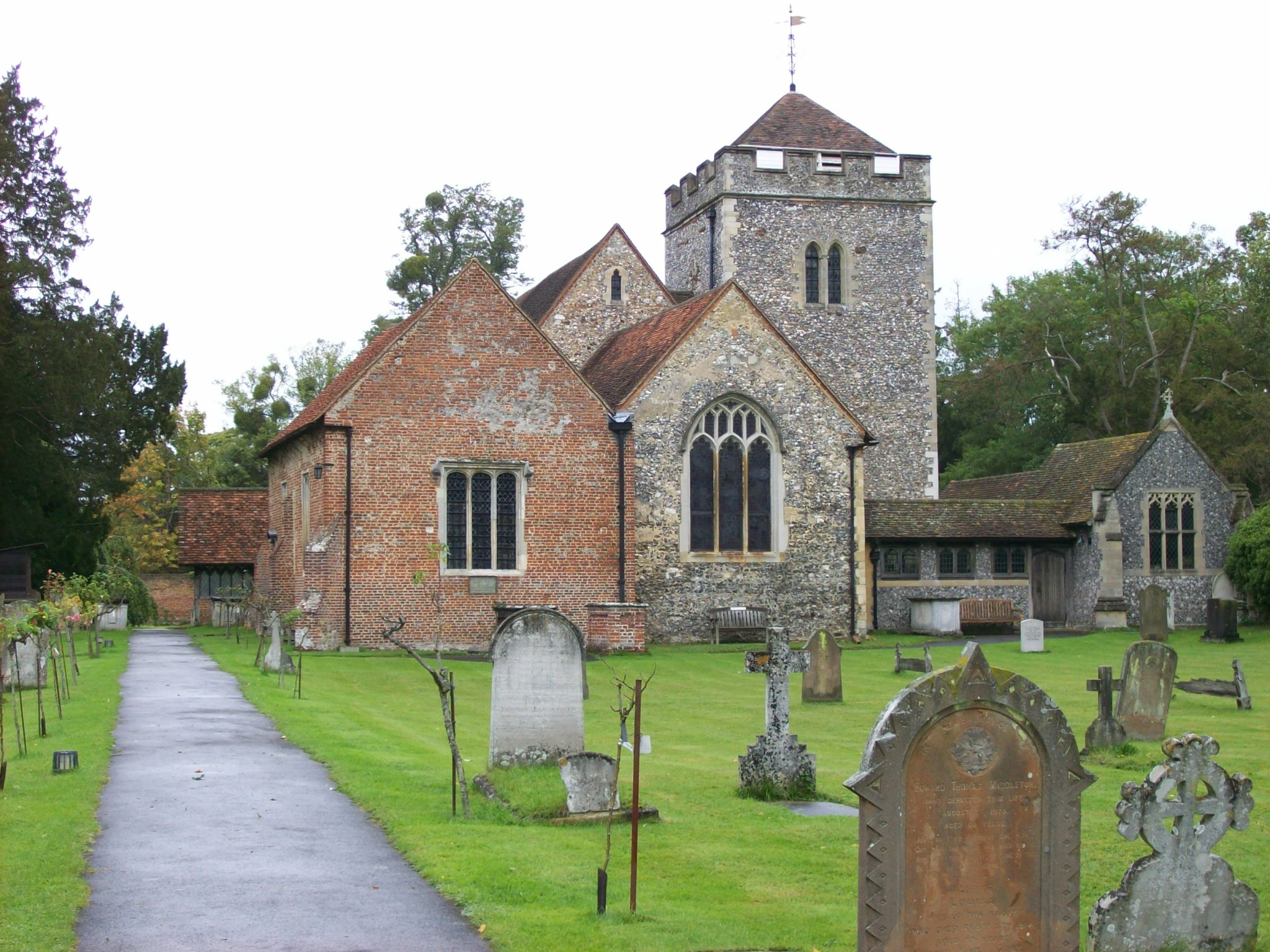
- St. Giles, Stoke Poges

- Location in Buckinghamshire
- 51°32′06″N 0°35′42″W
- OS grid reference: SU 97554 82728
- Location: Stoke Poges, Buckinghamshire
- Country: England
- Denomination: Church of England

History
- Dedication: Saint Giles

Architecture
- Functional status: Church of England parish church
- Heritage designation: Grade I
- Designated: 23 September 1955
- Architectural type: Church

St Giles' Church is an active parish church in the village of Stoke Poges, Buckinghamshire, England. A Grade I listed building, it stands in the grounds of Stoke Park, a late-Georgian mansion built by John Penn. It is famous as the apparent inspiration for Thomas Gray's poem "Elegy Written in a Country Churchyard"; Gray is buried in the churchyard.

== History and architecture ==
The origins of the church are Anglo-Saxon and Norman. The tower dates from the 13th century. The adjacent Hastings chapel was constructed in 1558 by Edward Hastings, 1st Baron Hastings of Loughborough, owner of the manor of Stoke Poges, who also undertook a substantial enlargement of the neighbouring manor house.

St Giles comprises a "battlemented" tower, a nave, a chancel and the Hastings Chapel. The church is built mainly of flint and chalk stone, with tiled roofs. The exception is the Hastings Chapel which is constructed of red brick. The style of the chapel is later than the Gothic of the church; Simon Jenkins, the writer and former chairman of the National Trust, describes it as "Tudor". The church has extensions to either side, a vestry of the early 20th century, and an entrance and vestibule installed in the Victorian period to provide private access to the church for the owners of the adjacent manor house. Elizabeth Williamson, in the 2003 revised edition, Buckinghamshire, of the Pevsner Buildings of England series, considered the Victorian porch an "excrescence".

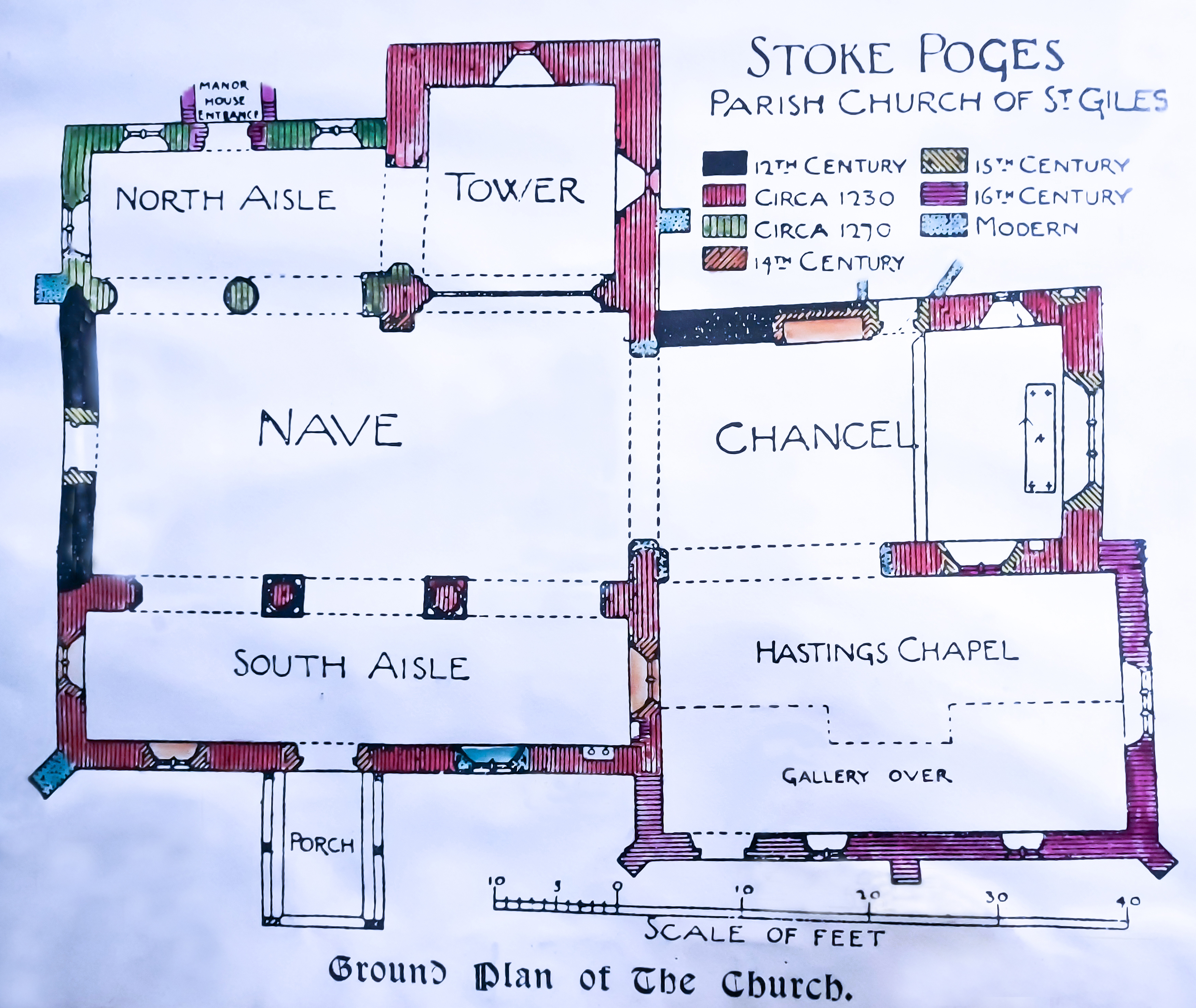
Ground floor plan of St Giles' church, between 1840s and 1940s

During the Victorian era, a restoration was carried out by George Edmund Street. Jenkins, in his volume England's Thousand Best Churches, thought that the exterior was treated more sympathetically than the interior. Of the latter, he describes the removal of the plasterwork in the nave, together with the replacement of the Norman chancel arch and the opening up of the hammerbeam roof, as giving the church the appearance of "a barn".

St Giles remains an active parish church in the Church of England, administered as part of the Diocese of Oxford. The churchyard has been used as a filming location. In the opening sequence of the James Bond movie, For Your Eyes Only, Bond enters the churchyard through the lychgate to pay his respects at the grave of his wife, Teresa. The churchyard also features in Judy Garland's final film, I Could Go On Singing.

Adjacent to the church are the Stoke Poges Memorial Gardens, founded in 1935 by Sir Noel Mobbs to ensure "the maintenance in perpetuity of the peace, quietness and beauty of the ancient church and churchyard". The gardens were landscaped by Edward White and contain a number of private plots for the interment of ashes, within a larger, Grade I listed park. The ashes of the film director Alexander Korda and the broadcaster Kenneth Horne, among others, are interred in the garden.

St Giles is a Grade I listed building. Gray's tomb is designated Grade II. The Gray Monument (adjacent to St Giles' church and owned by the National Trust) is listed at Grade II*. The lychgate is by John Oldrid Scott and is a Grade II listed structure. The churchyard also contains war graves of six British armed services personnel, four of World War I and two of World War II.

=== Stained glass ===
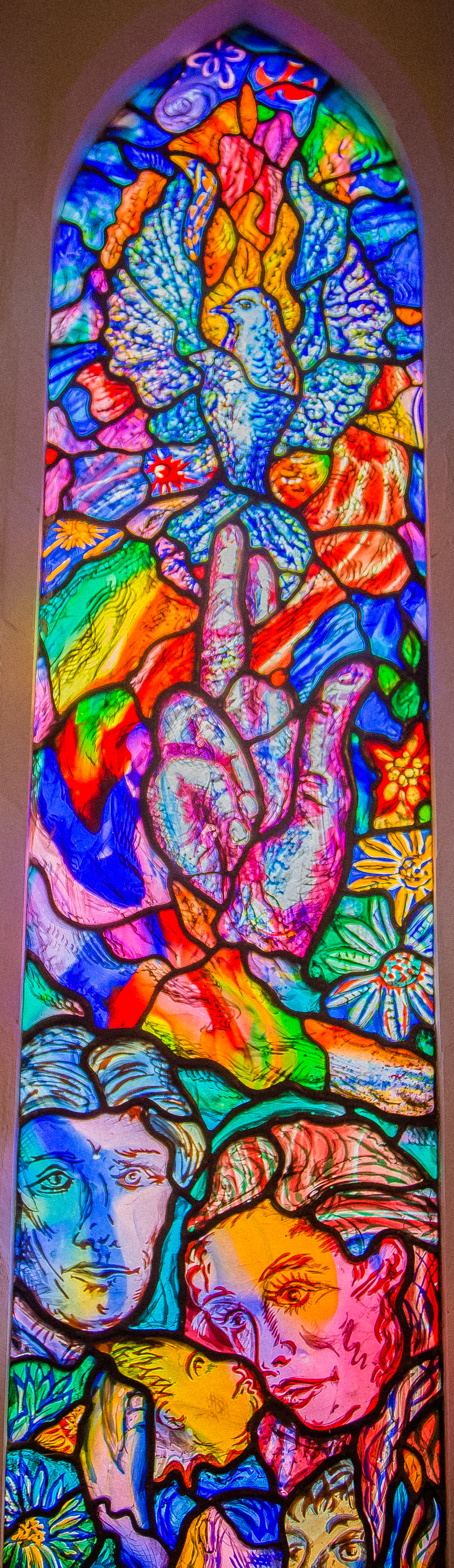
Part of 'The Love of God' window

There is a wide variety of stained glass which accounts for virtually every window of the church. There is 17th century glass to modern late 20th century designs. The cloisters used to have glass depicting coats of arms relating to persons known to Sir Edward Coke, a former owner of the adjoining Manor House. That glass, according to tradition, is said to have come across from the Manor House upon its partial demolition in 1790. In 1946 during restoration work, glass displaying the coat of arms were fitted in the Hastings chapel. The arms represent: Roger Manners; John Fortescue; Sir Walter Mildmay and of families of Ducie, Pipe, Sheffield and Pyott. The restoration resulted in a new East central window of the Crucifixion by Martin Travers and Lawrence Lee replacing an image of the founder of the chapel, Lord Hastings of Loughborough. The large west window of the nave is the work of Charles Kemp, in memory of Edward Coleman. The work of Louis Davies is in the north west corner, remembering Rev St John Parry and pupils of Stoke House school in Stoke Poges. The south aisle of the nave have vibrant windows by Mayer & Co. which remembers the death of a small child of the Howard Vyse family. The modern glass created in 1998 by Richard Molyneux and David Wasley is in the tower. It is called, 'The Love of God' but also The Mothers' Union window, remembering Mary Thorpe.

Huge panels of early 16th century glass were fitted in a private vestibule in mid-Victorian times, by Edward Coleman, the owner of Stoke Park, Buckinghamshire. In the 1920s the glass was removed; the church became owner of the vestibule and glass was subsequently sold in 1929. In the 21st century, they form major documents of excellent stained glass of the period at the Detroit Institute of Arts.

== Memorials and monuments ==
There are many memorials throughout the church. The major ones are an Easter Sepulchre purportedly to remember the Robber Baron Sir John de Moleyns and for his tomb; in the north aisle the monument to Nathaniel Marchant created by John Flaxman and in the Hastings chapel a mural monument of the early 18th century, without any inscription, yet most probably for Sir Thomas Clarges or his son, Sir Walter; also a stone to Dr Gregory Hascard. A tablet in the South aisle beside the former Thomas Gray pew is for many close descendants of William Penn including son, Thomas Penn and grandsons, John Penn and Granville Penn and Sophia Penn, the wife of Field Marshal Sir William Gomm.

=== War memorials ===
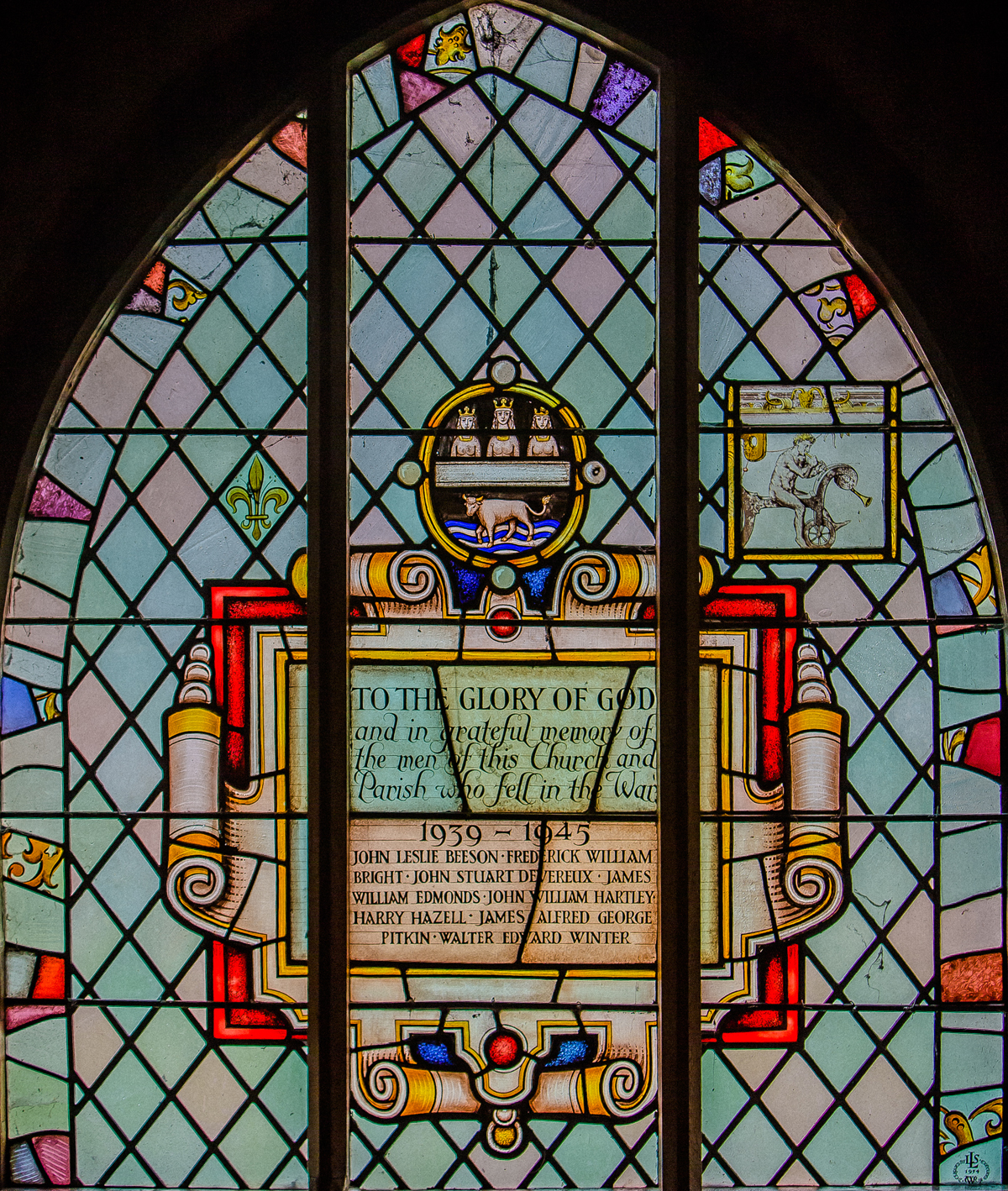
World War II memorial window

There are three large war memorials inside the church. The World War One marble tablet memorial, lists 48 men from Stoke Poges who died. The memorial was executed by Sir Ernest George and Mr Basil Gotto, a sculptor. It is located in the chancel. The World War Two stained glass window memorial lists 8 men from Stoke Poges who died. The memorial was designed by Lawrence Lee and executed by Christopher Wallis. It is at the west end of the nave. Also incorporated in the window are the coat of arms of the Diocese of Oxford and an ancient restored image of a person on a hobby horse blowing through a trumpet, known as the 'bicycle window'. Men who had attended Stoke House School in Stoke Poges and later died in the South Africa War (1901–1903) are remembered by a stained glass window which depicts St Michael and St George. The window was designed by Louis Davis. It is located in the north aisle.

A Norman lancet window in the chancel was restored in 1947 and it remembers the men and women of Britain and Allies who died in World War II. Another lancet window in the chancel, remembers Captain Frederick Henry Allhusen of the 9th Royal Lancers who served in South Africa during 1899.

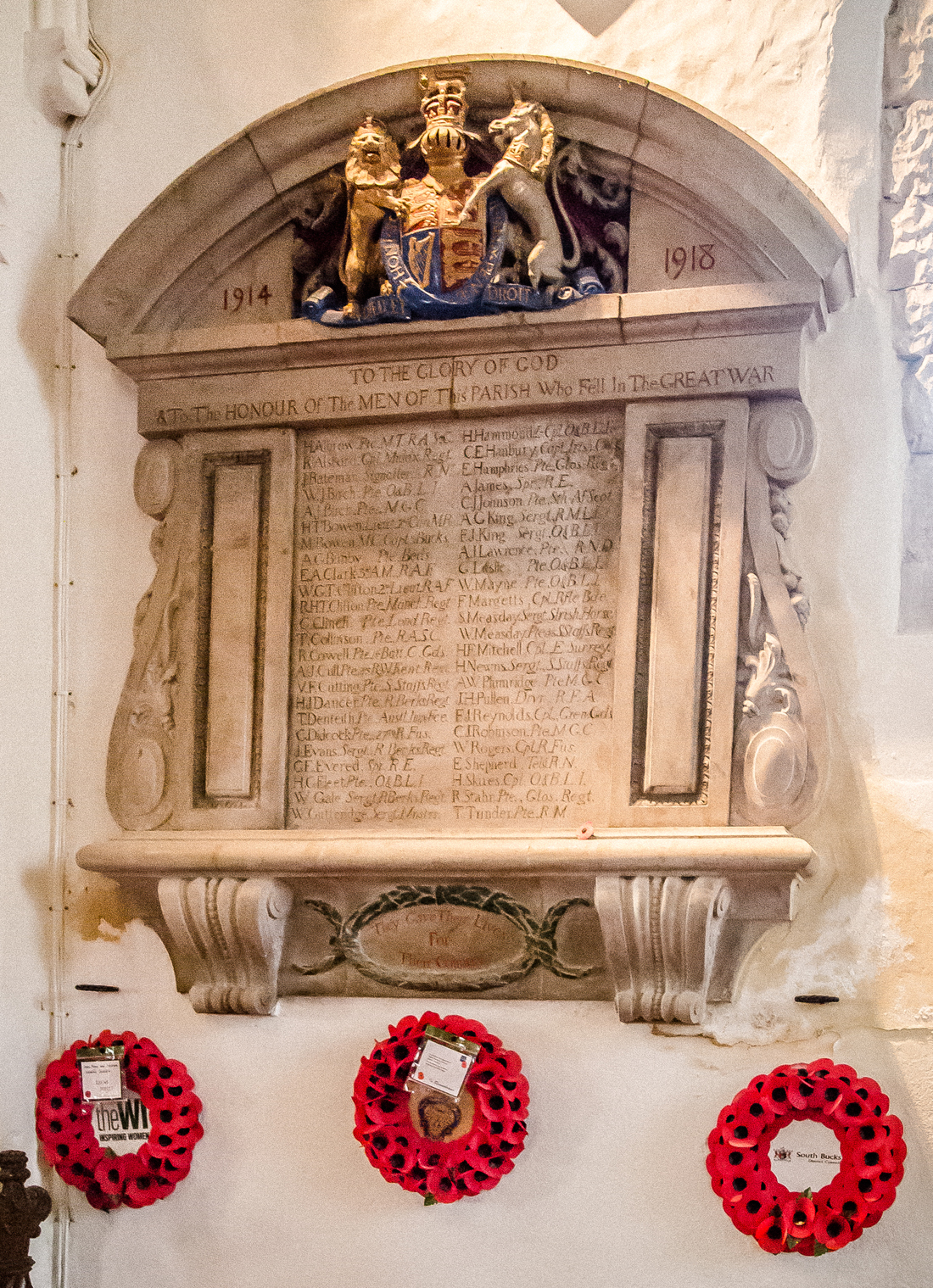
World War I memorial

=== Memorials to individuals killed in action ===
There are three memorials to men who were killed in action. Killed in 1882 was Lieutenant Henry Granville Lindsay who was serving in the 60th Rifles, mounted infantry, died in Egypt. He is remembered on a brass plaque along with members of the Howard Vyse family. It is located in the south aisle. Killed in 1914 was Lieutenant Samuel Vernon Einem Hickson who was serving in the Loyal North Lancashire Regiment, died in Tanga. He is remembered on a memorial stone in the nave. Killed in 1944 was Pilot Officer John Stuart Deveraux who was serving in Egypt. He is remembered on a stone tablet in the Hastings chapel.

=== Other military memorials ===
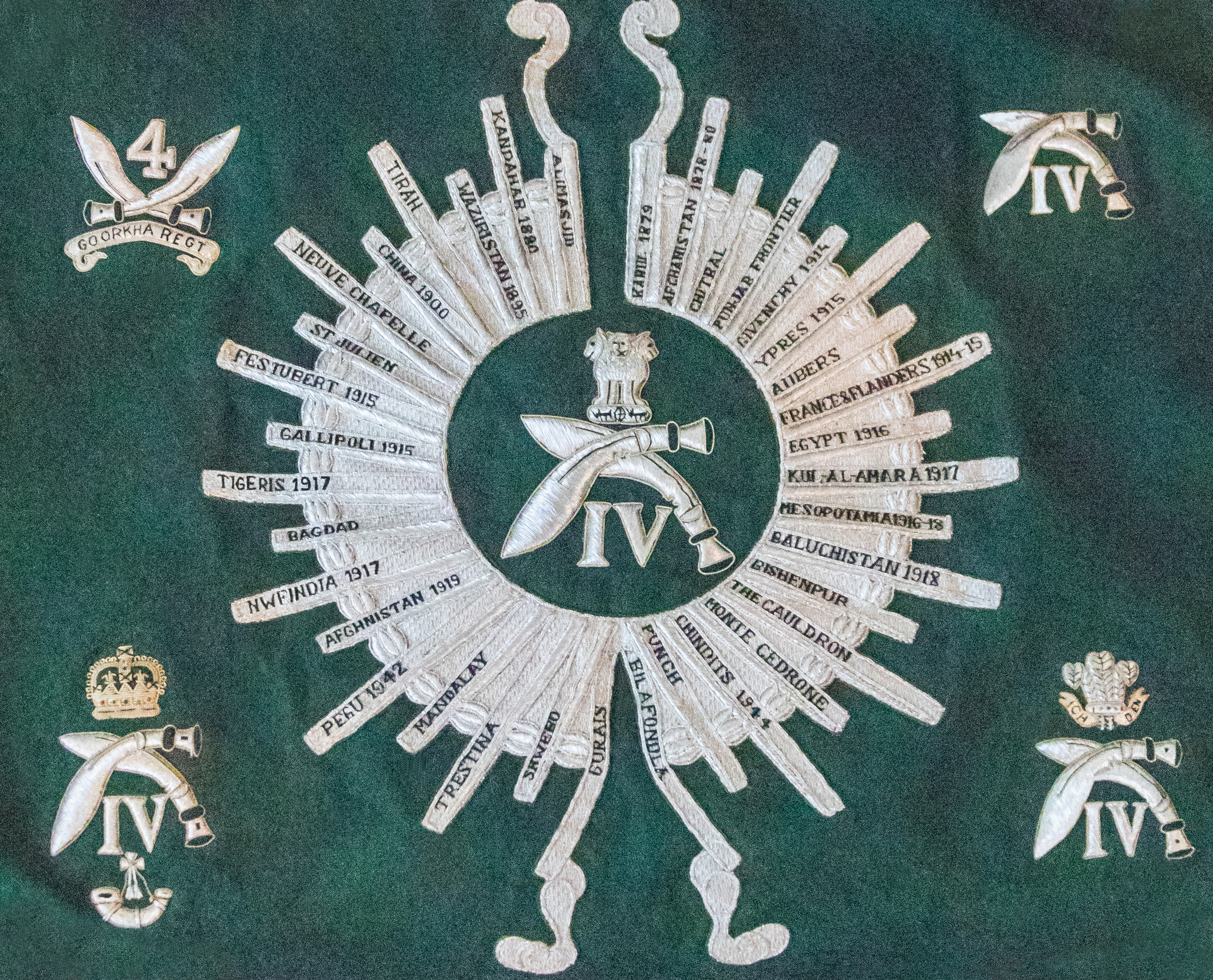
Part of the 'Gurkha Rifles flag

Inside the Hastings chapel are items remembering the 4th Prince of Wales's Own (PWO) Gurkha Rifles which includes an Officers' Book of Remembrance and a battle honours Regimental flag. The Vicar is the Honorary Chaplain to the PWO 4th Gurkha Rifles Officers Association.

One of the Standards of the Royal Horse Guard (The Blues) has been lodged in the nave beside memorials to the Howard Vyse family of Stoke Place due in part because Major General Sir Richard Howard –Vyse of Stoke Place had been the Colonel of the Royal Horse Guards (The Blues).

=== Monumental brass ===
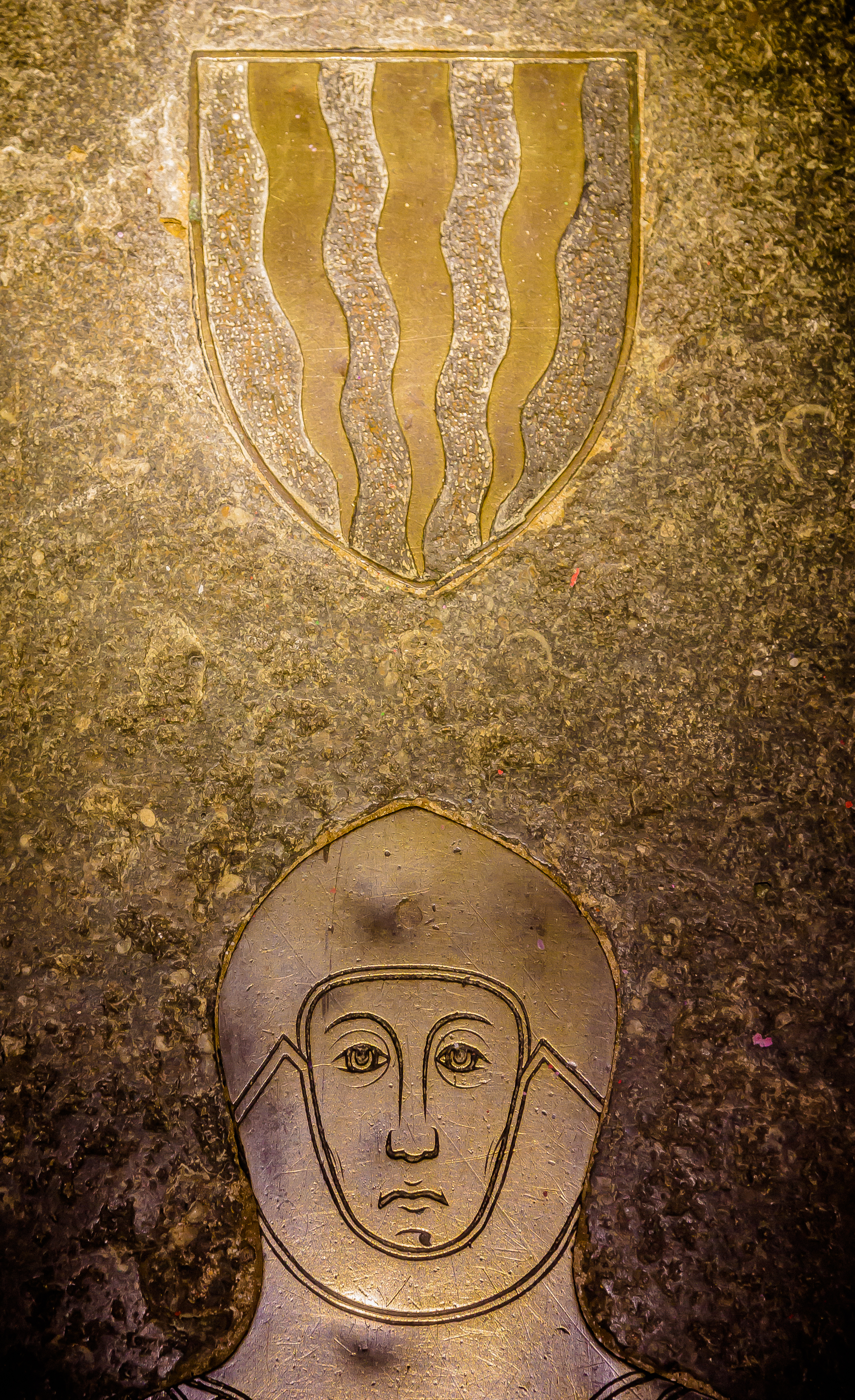
Effigy and arms of Sir William de Moleyns

On the north side of the altar is the oldest brass, which is to Sir William de Moleyns who died in 1425 at the Siege of Orléans, and his wife, Margaret. On the south side is part of the brass for their daughter and heiress Alianore, but her effigy has been removed leaving only the inscription and arms. The third brass at the front of the altar was removed in the late 20th century, except for the arms. It was to Edmund Hampdyn and his wife, Isabel.

=== Funeral hatchments ===
There are nineteen funeral hatchments hung on the walls of the chancel, Hastings chapel and tower. This is the most funeral hatchments in one building within the county of Buckinghamshire. The funeral hatchments are for the following people, with their motto where shown:

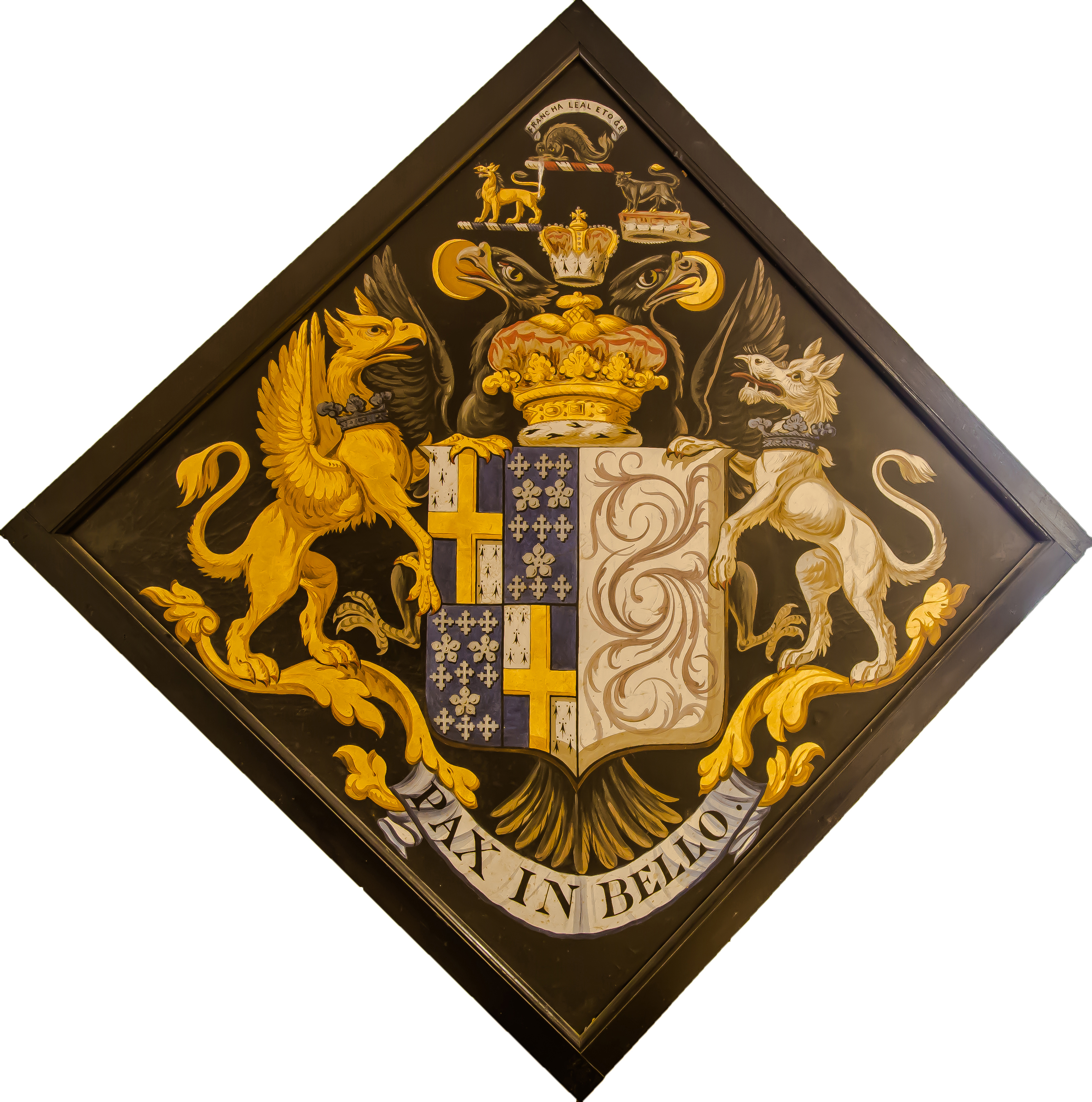
Funeral Hatchment for George Godolphin Osborne, 8th Duke of Leeds

- Thomas Dawson (d.1813), 1st Viscount Cremorne, of County of Monaghan, Ireland and later Stoke Park. Motto: Toujours propice.
- Elizabeth Gayer (buried 1714), probably, daughter of Robert Gayer of Stoke Poges Manor House. Motto: Mors janua vitae.
- George Godolphin Osborne (d.1872). 8th Duke of Leeds, of Baylis House. Motto: Pax in bello
- Sophia Gomm (d.1827), wife of Field Marshal Sir William Gomm. Daughter of Granville Penn.
- Elizabeth Howard (d.1791), the second wife of Field Marshal Sir George Howard of Stoke Place. daughter of Peter Beckford of Jamaica, and widow of Thomas Howard, 2nd Earl of Effingham. Motto: Virtus mille scuta.
- Frances Howard-Vyse (d.1841), wife of Major General Richard William Howard Howard-Vyse of Stoke Place. The 2nd daughter of Henry Hesketh of Newtown, Cheshire. Motto: Virtus mille scuta.
- George Howard (d.1796), Field Marshal Sir, of Stoke Place. Motto: Virtus mille scuta.
- Lucy Howard (d.1771), the first wife of Field Marshal Sir George Howard of Stoke Place. sister of William Wentworth, 2nd Earl of Strafford. Motto: Mors janua vitae.

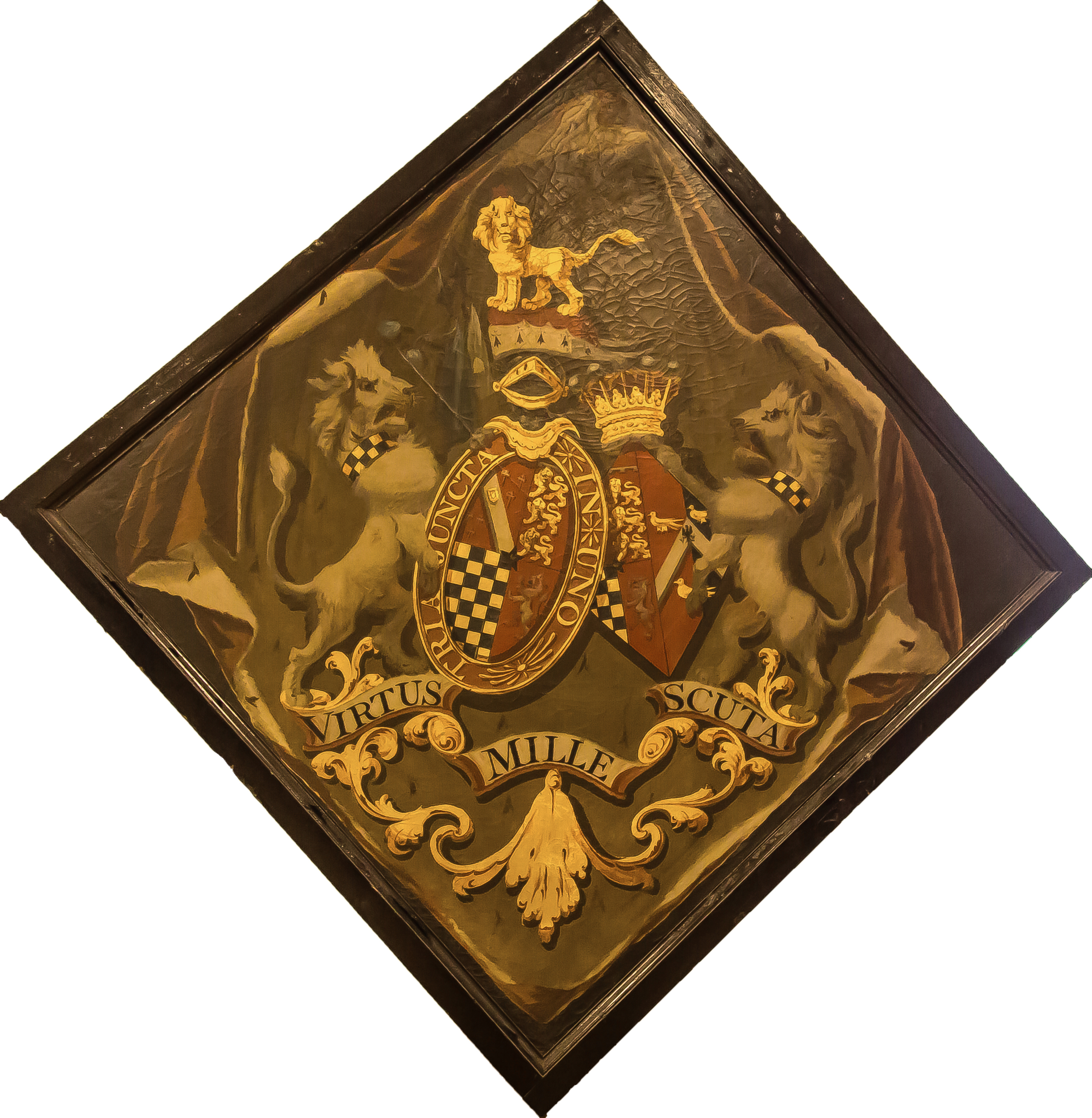
Funeral Hatchment for Field Marshal Sir George Howard

- Richard Henry Howard-Vyse (d.1872) of Stoke Place. Motto: Virtus mille scuta
- Richard William Howard Howard-Vyse (d.1853). Major General. of Stoke Place. Motto: Virtus mille scuta.
- Granville Penn (d.1834) of Stoke Park. Motto: Dum clavum teneam.
- Isabella Penn (d.1847), wife of Granville Penn of Stoke Park. Eldest daughter of General Gordon Forbes. Motto: In coelo quies.
- John Penn (d.1834). of Stoke Park
- Juliana Penn (d.1801), wife of Thomas Penn of Stoke Poges Manor House. Motto: Resurgam.
- Thomas Penn of Stoke Poges Manor House. Motto: Dum clavum teneam.
- Frances Pigot (d.1811), wife of Admiral Hugh Pigot and daughter of the Very Rev. Sir Richard Wrottesley, 7th Baronet, Dean of Worcester.
- Frances Stapleton (d.1746), 1st married to Sir William Stapleton, 3rd Baronet, and 2nd marriage to Colonel Walter Hamilton, Governor of the Leeward Islands and daughter of Sir James Russell. Motto: Mors janua vita
- Sir John Chrichloe Turner (d.1813), of Castle Carlton, Lincolnshire. Motto: Spero
- Mr Woodhouse. The smallest hatchment and oldest in the church, probably of the late 17th century)

== Clergy ==
Clergy of Church of St Giles, Stoke Poges, Buckinghamshire, 1107 — |-
From	To	Name	Patron	Comment
1107		Aluredus		
1222		Alarus de Netel	Prior and Convent of St. Mary Overy, Southwark	
1224		Geoffrey de Haveringdon	Ditto	
1228		John de Dryn	Ditto	
1274	1275	Nicholas de London	Ditto	
1294		William de Mersham	Ditto	
1321		Walter de Ipswich	Ditto	
1333	1334	William de Medburn	Ditto	
1365		Robert Nell	Ditto	or spelt NELE. Died 1365
1365		Thomas Bray	Ditto	
1386		John Milward	Ditto	
1399		Thomas Chapman	Ditto	
1414		Thomas Clerk	Ditto	Exchanged for Leatherhead
1414		John Gallys	Ditto	Instituted October 3
1417		John Cully	Ditto	
1421		Edward Pepying	Ditto	
1454	1455	Thomas Howe	Ditto	
1461		John Fowkes	Ditto	
1474		Abraham Repyngdon	Ditto	
1479	1480	Alexander White	Bishop of London, by lapse	
1489		Robert Blakeloke		Prior and Convent of St. Mary Overy, Southwark
1508		Robert Taylor	Ditto	
1530		Milo Braythwayt	Ditto	
1531	1532	John Dogeson	Ditto	
1537		Oliver Stacy	Ditto	also supporting Vicar in 1540 were Chantry Priests of Andreas Clarke and Johannes Lovyngton
1555		John Munden	Edward Windsor, Esq.	
1562		Richard Pennington	Elizabeth I	
1563		Andrew Pury	Elizabeth I	
1591		Samuel Keltridge	Richard Tredway, Esq.	
1601		John Duffield	Walter Tredway, Esq.	also In 1616 Ric Smith was a preacher. Royal chaplain in extraordinary
1619		Abraham Montague	Elizabeth Tredway	
1630		Randolph Wade	Unknown	
1637		Nicholas Lovell	William Stafford, Esq.	
1657		Adam Lewgar	Unknown	
1661		Thomas Bowen	Sir Thomas Clarges	
1664		Rowland Gower	Sir Thomas Clarges	
1675		Robert Vile	Sir Thomas Clarges	Resigned in 1679
1679		John Provote	Sir Thomas Clarges	Resigned in 1687
1687		Richard Redding	Sir Thomas Clarges	Died in 1718
1719		Francis Philipps	Matthew Snow, Esq.	
1726		Thomas Dolben	George Clarges, Esq.	
1754		Henry Duckworth	Lord Francis Osborne	Died in 1794
1794		Richard Kilsha	Ditto	also assisting as Curates in 1797 was William Nettleship and in 1802 was Arthur Bold
1803		Arthur Bold	Ditto	also assisting as Stipendiary Curates in 1820 was Henry Thomas Atkins; in 1824 was William Home and in 1827 was George William Brooks. Died 1831
1831		William Nickson	Ditto	also assisting as Stipendiary Curate in 1831 was Hon. Sidney Godolphin Osborne who paid to reside in vicarage house. Resigned in 1832
1832		Hon. Sidney Godolphin Osborne	Rt.Hon. Lord Godolphin	
1841		John Shaw	Ditto	
1866		Vernon Blake	Duke of Leeds	
1902		Joshua Fielding Hoyle	Ditto	
1912		Arthur T. Barnett	Ditto	
1926		Mervyn J. Clare	Ditto	
1945		David Henry Bryant Bevan	Ditto	
1968		Cyril Evans Harris	Ditto	
1999		Harry Latham		Christ Church Cathedral, Oxford
2018		Natasha Brady		current in 2024

Clergy have also worked in the Parish of Stoke Poges at the Lord Hastings Hospital; the Mission Room; the Chapel of Ease:St Wilfred's and St Andrew's Church Centre

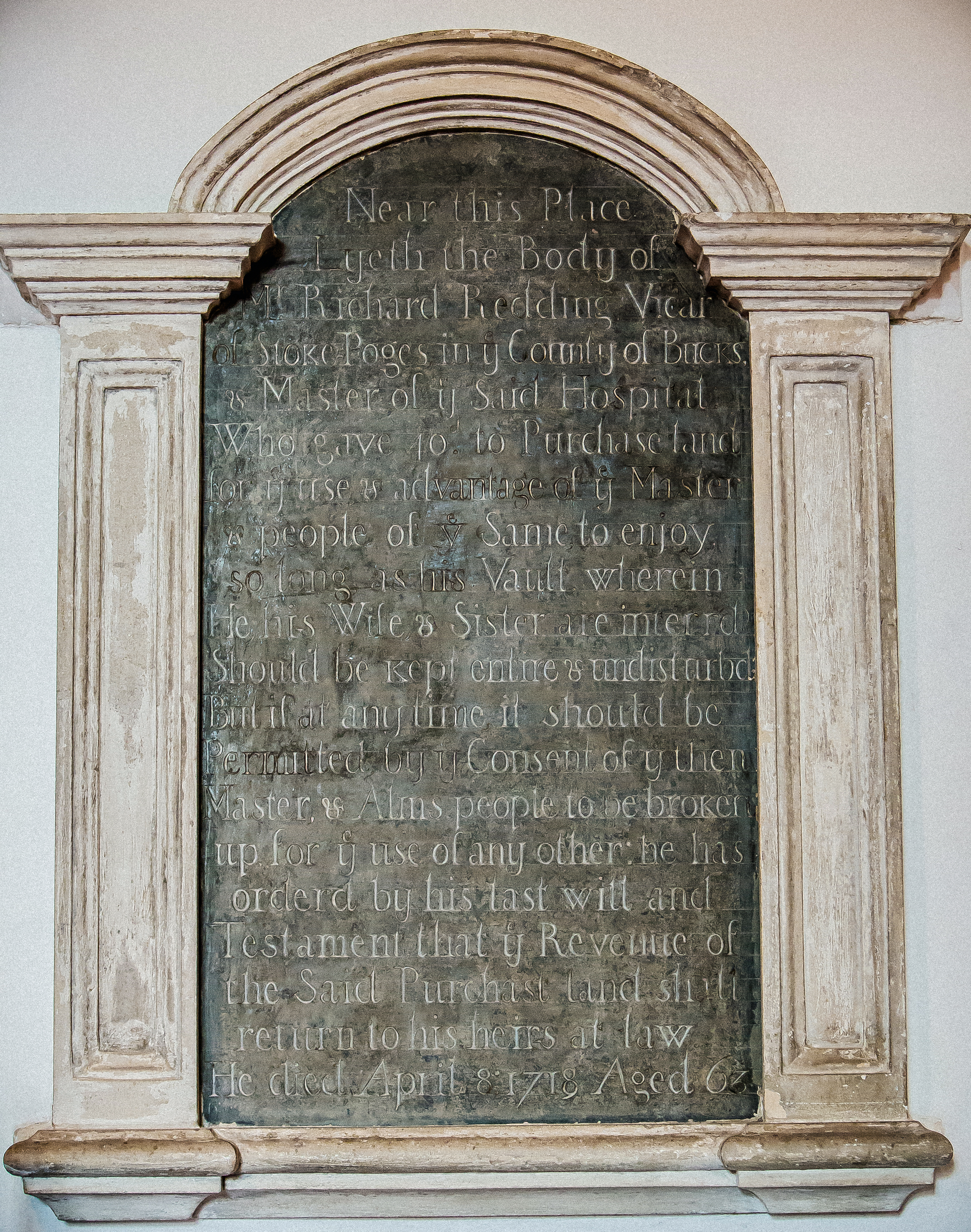
Memorial for Revd Richard Redding in the Hastings chapel

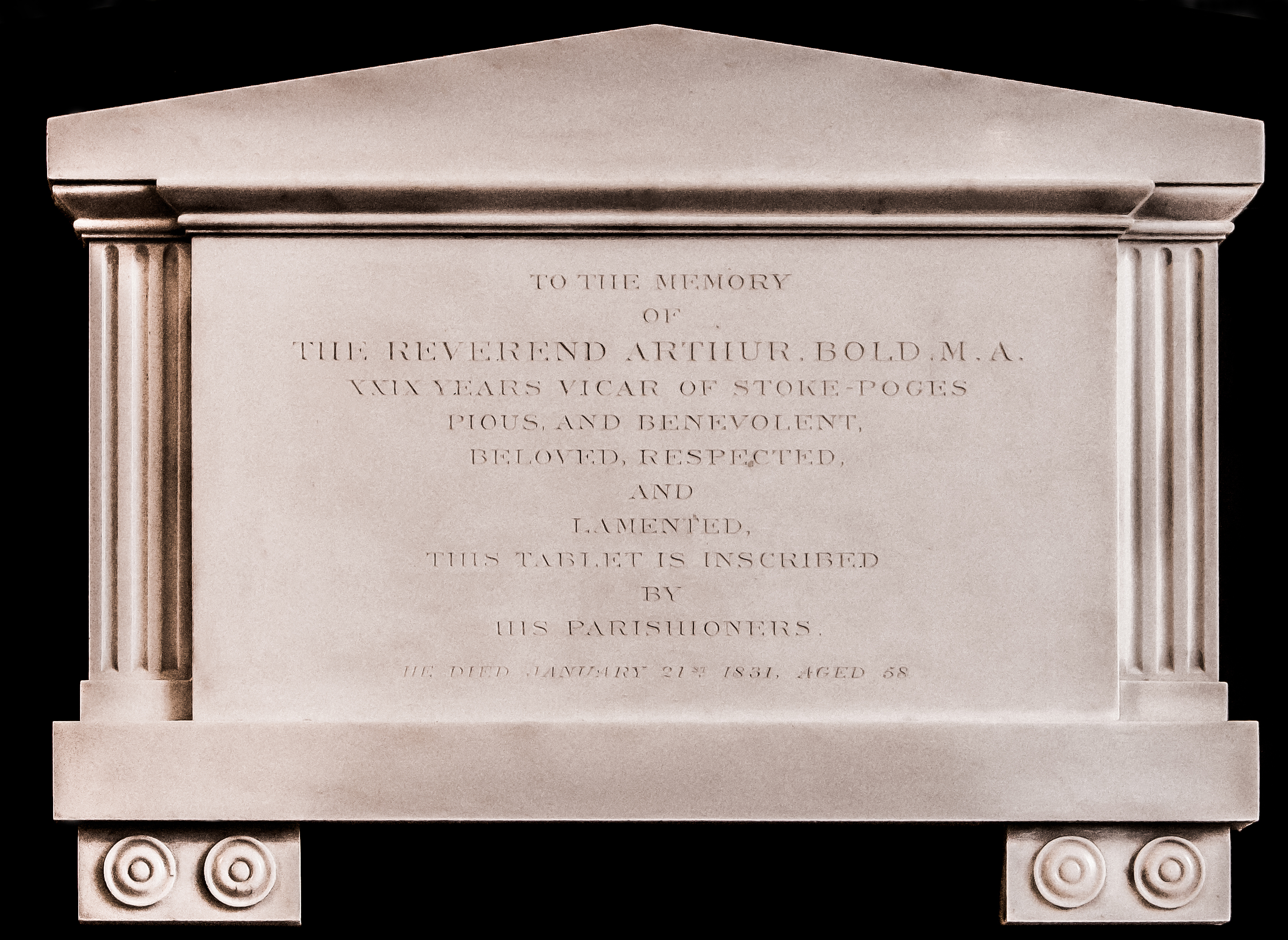
Memorial for Revd Arthur Bold in the choir

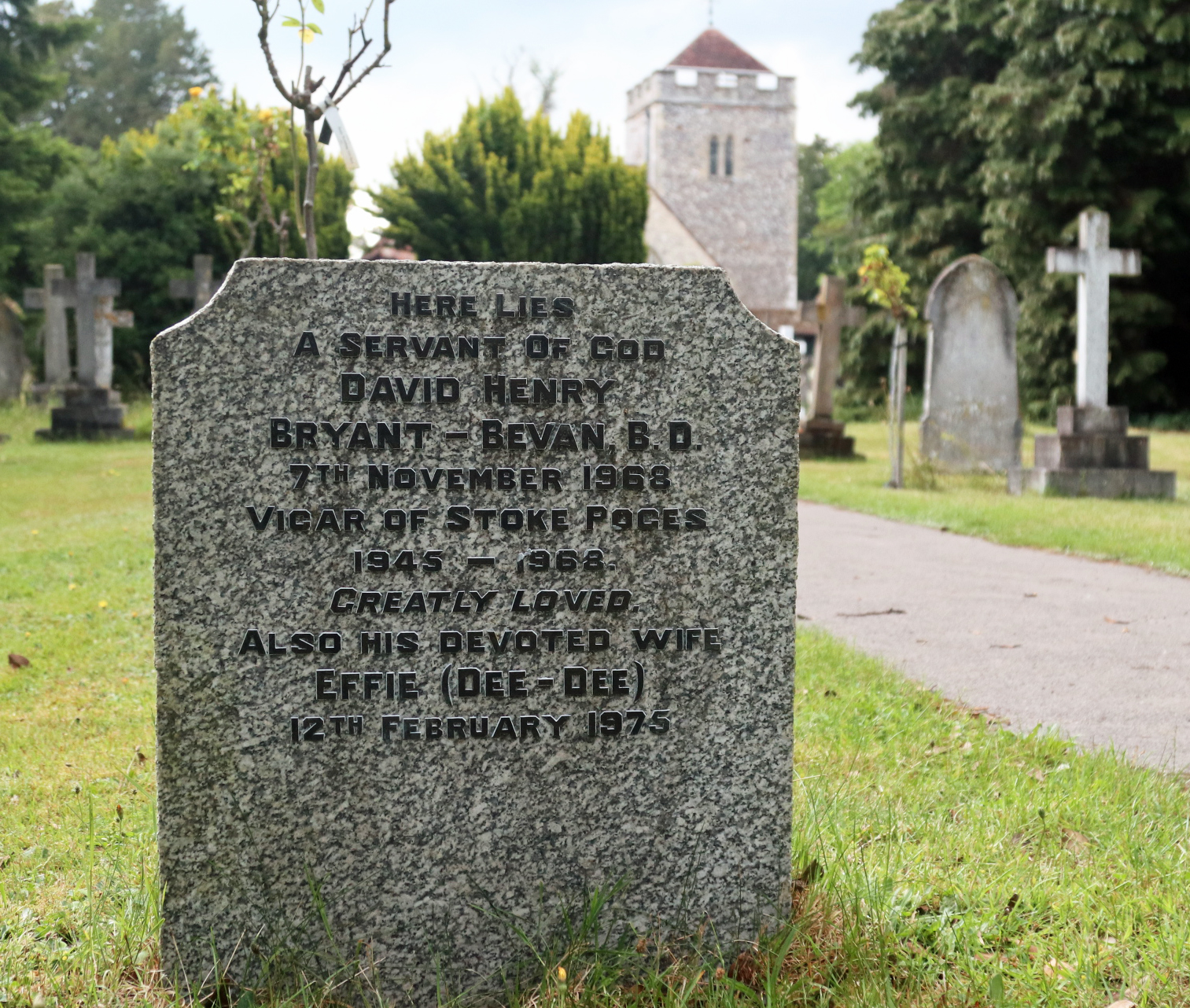
Grave of Revd David H. Bryant-Bevan in the churchyard

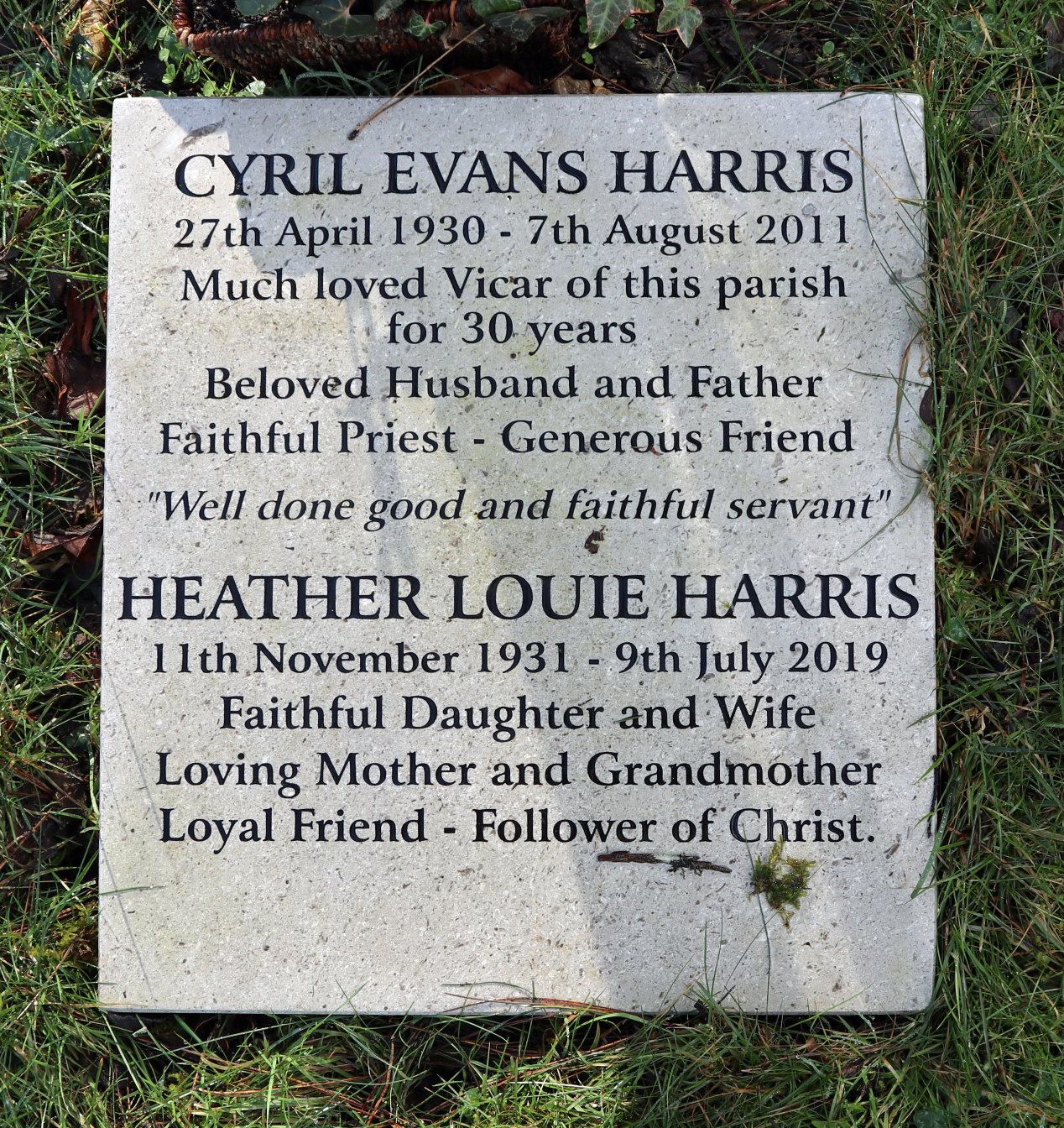
Grave of Revd Cyril E. Harris in the churchyard

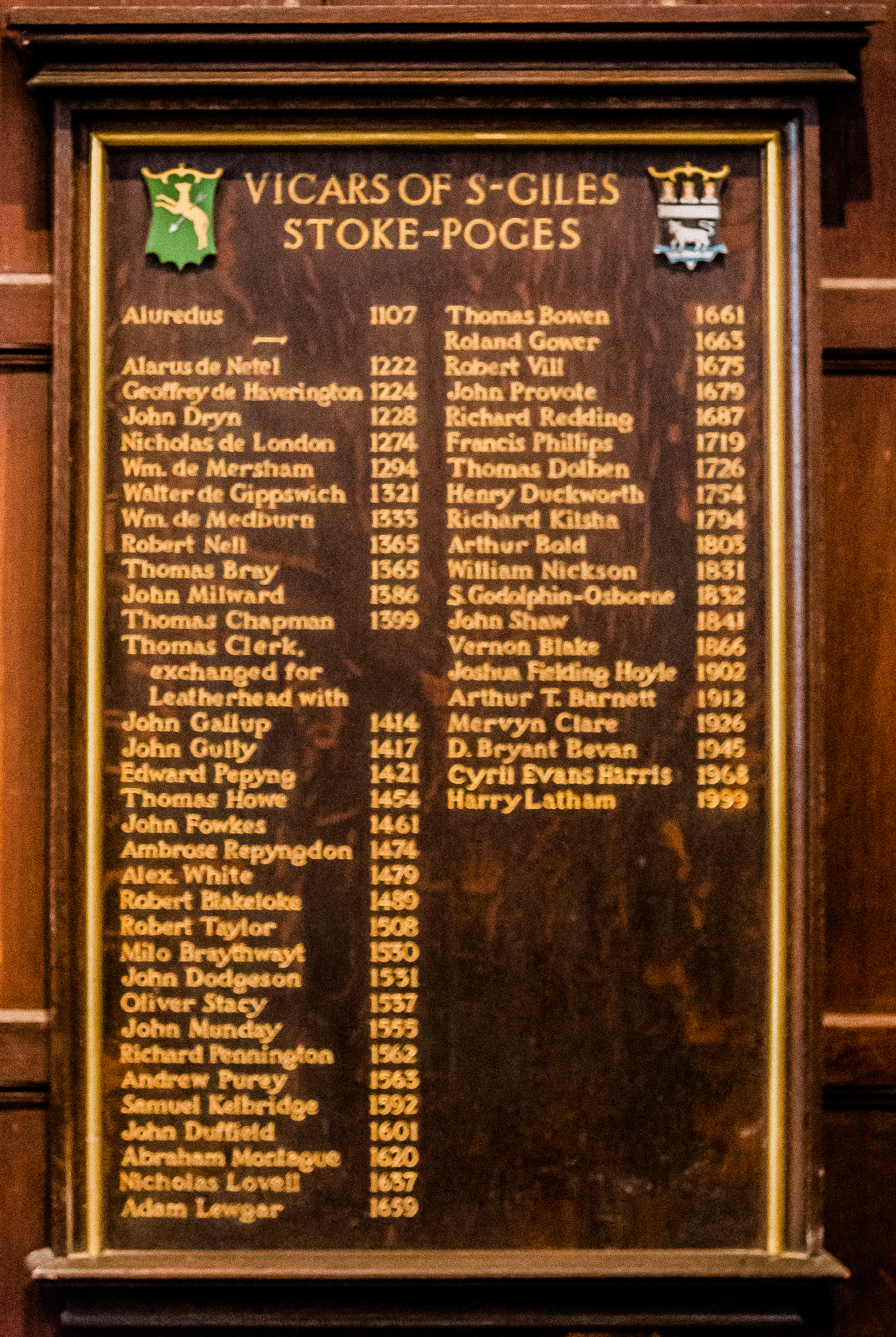
Board listing Vicars to 2000 in the tower

== Bells ==
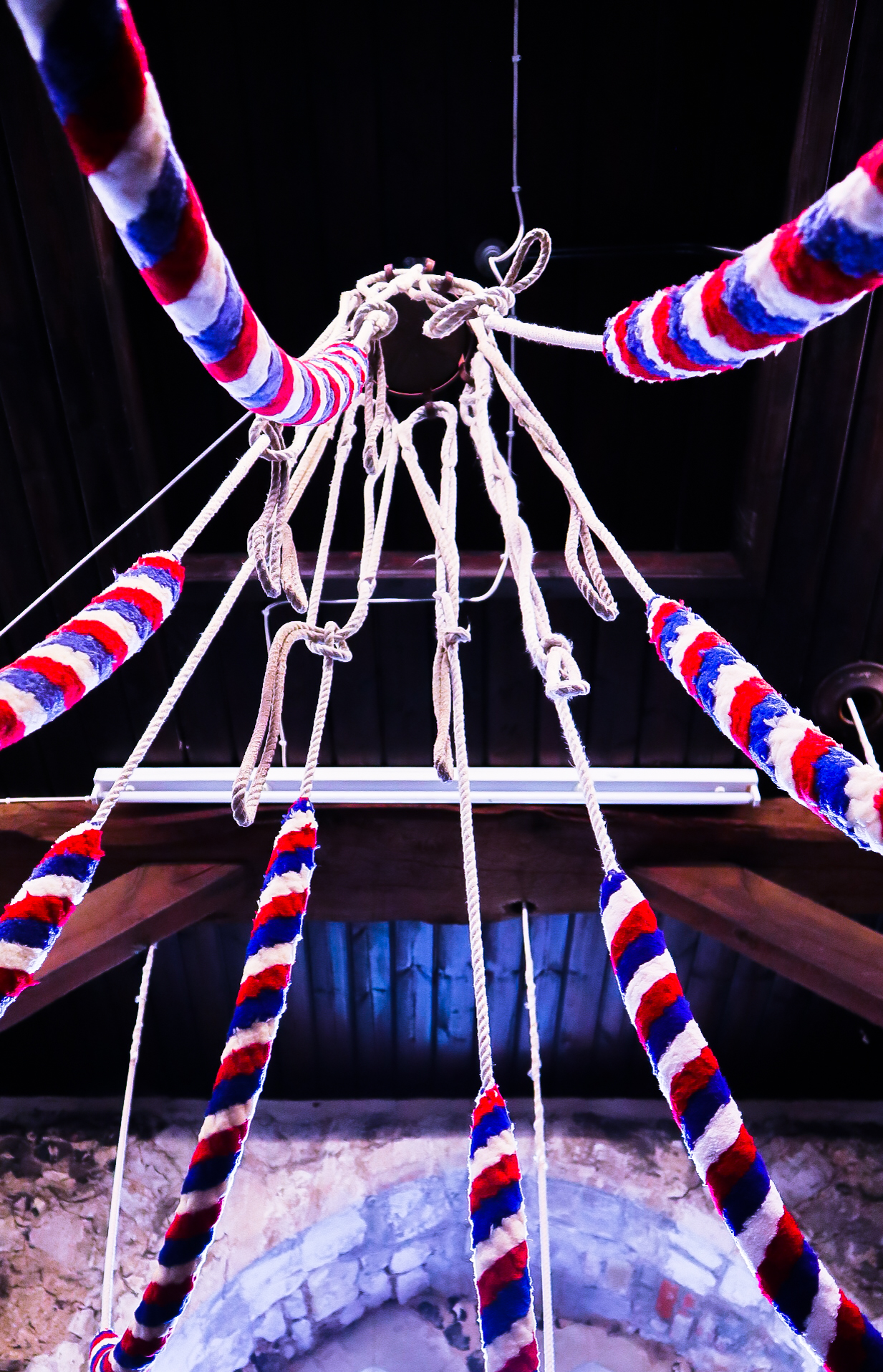
Sallies and ropes for the 8 bells

The three oldest bells date from 1728. Restoration work of a total of six bells took place in 1894, carried out by Mears and Stainbank in Whitechapel, London. In 1912 the bells were rehung in a new iron frame. Twelve years later, following the removal of the spire, a new ringing chamber was created above what had been a gallery: directly above the 'Manor House – Penn pews' within the tower. The chamber is accessed from external stairs.

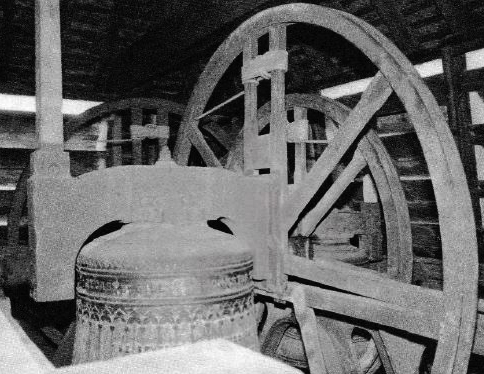
A stay, headstock, wheel and bell in the bell tower

The bells were rehung and augmented in 1938 to give a ring of eight. 20th-century rehang and recast on each occasion has been carried out by the Gillett & Johnston bell foundry. The bells are rung "full circle".

Details of the bells
Bell	Weight	Note	Diameter	Year cast	Founder
1	3 long cwt 3 qr 10 lb (430 lb or 195 kg)	F♯	25 1/2 in (650 mm)	1937	Gillett & Johnson, Croydon
2	3 long cwt 3 qr 9 lb (429 lb or 195 kg)	E♯	26 in (660 mm)	1937	Gillett & Johnson, Croydon
3	3 long cwt 2 qr 13 lb (405 lb or 184 kg)	D♯	27 in (690 mm)	1824	Mears, London
4	4 long cwt 2 qr 6 lb (510 lb or 231 kg)	C♯	29 1/2 in (750 mm)	1772	Swain, London
5	5 long cwt 2 qr 22 lb (638 lb or 289 kg)	B	31 3/4 in (810 mm)	1728	Phelps, London
6	6 long cwt 1 qr 23 lb (723 lb or 328 kg)	A♯	33 3/4 in (860 mm)	1773	Swain, London
7	8 long cwt 1 qr 5 lb (929 lb or 421 kg)	G♯	37 1/8 in (940 mm)	1728	Phelps, London
8	13 long cwt 2 qr 3 lb (1,515 lb or 687 kg)	F♯	42 1/4 in (1,070 mm)	1728	Phelps, London

== Thomas Gray and "Elegy Written in a Country Churchyard" ==
Beneath those rugged elms, that yew-tree's shade,
Where heaves the turf in many a mouldering heap,
Each in his narrow cell for ever laid,
The rude forefathers of the hamlet sleep.

— Gray's Elegy (1750)

Thomas Gray was a regular visitor to Stoke Poges, which was home to his mother and an aunt, and the churchyard at St Giles is reputed to have been the inspiration for his "Elegy Written in a Country Churchyard", though this is not universally accepted. Some scholars suggest that much, or all, of the poem was written in Cambridge, where Gray lived. Other commentators have identified as alternative possibilities St Mary's, Everdon, Northamptonshire; and St Laurence's Church, Upton-cum-Chalvey, Berkshire. The poem certainly had a long gestation, but it was completed at Stoke Poges in 1750. In June of that year, Gray wrote to his friend and supporter, Horace Walpole; "I have been here at Stoke a few days and having put an end to a thing, whose beginning you have seen long ago, I immediately send it to you." A. L. Lytton Sells writes that there is "no doubt" about the identification of St Giles as the churchyard of Gray's Elegy, and Robert L. Mack calls it "very close to irrefutable".

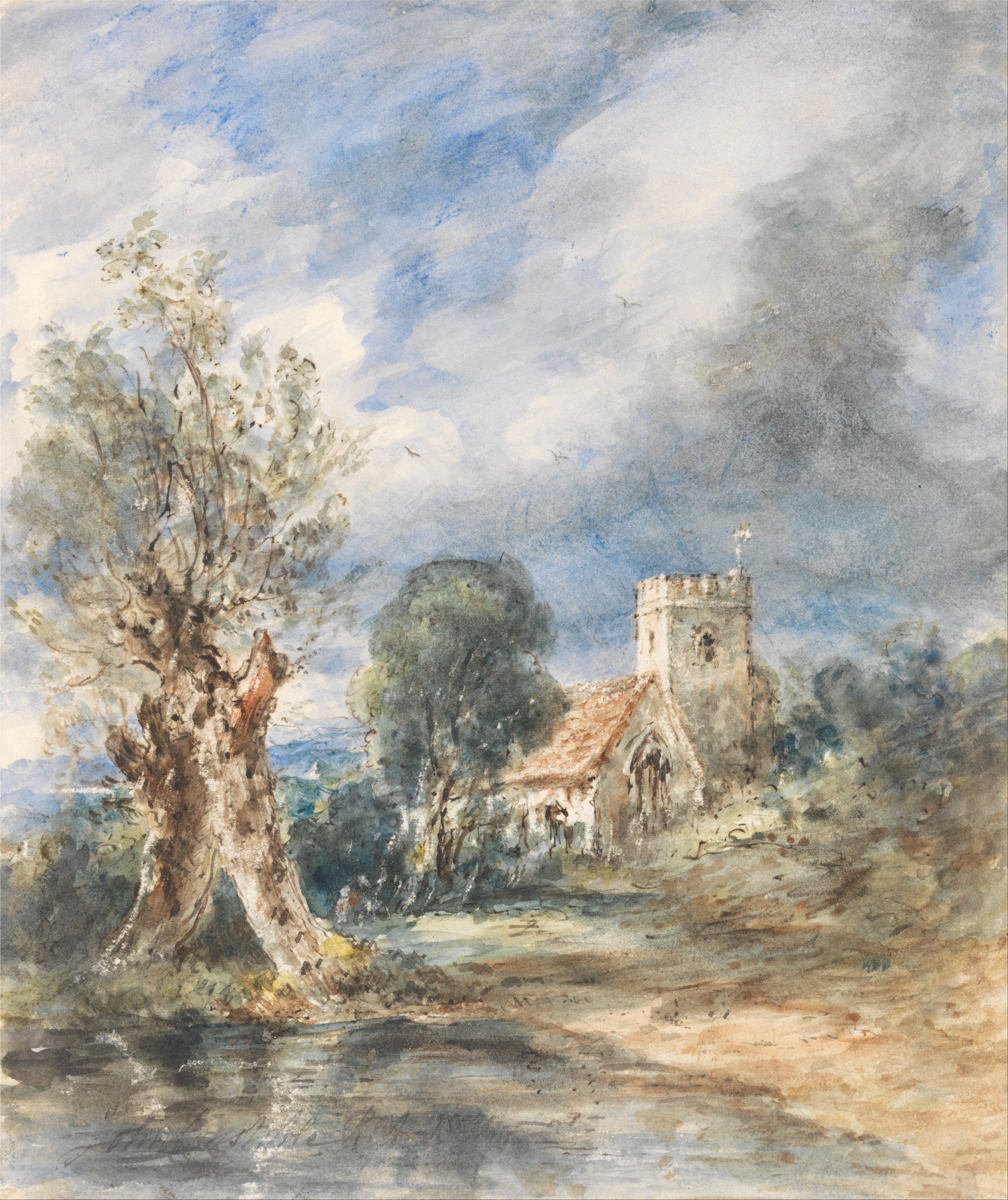
Watercolour of St Giles by John Constable (1834)

In 1771 Gray was buried (in accordance with his instructions) in the churchyard, in the vault erected for his mother and aunt. The tomb above records the names, ages and dates of death of Gray's mother and aunt, and his own tribute to his mother ("the careful tender mother of many children, one of whom alone had the misfortune to survive her") but no reference to Gray himself. Instead, his death and burial are recorded on a plaque set into the adjacent, external wall of the Hastings Chapel.

Gray's Monument, a sarcophagus set on a pedestal inscribed with stanzas from the Elegy, was commissioned by John Penn to a James Wyatt design, as a memorial to Gray himself, as a tribute to the Elegy, and as an eye-catcher for Penn's Stoke Park estate.

Artists have embellished publications of Gray's works with their paintings of the church and Gray's tomb. The following artists have painted scenes: Joseph Barrow; William Barron; William Blake; John Constable; Hendrik de Cort; Jasper Cropsey, in addition Humphry Repton, illustrated the Church in his Red Book of Stoke Park.

== Gallery ==
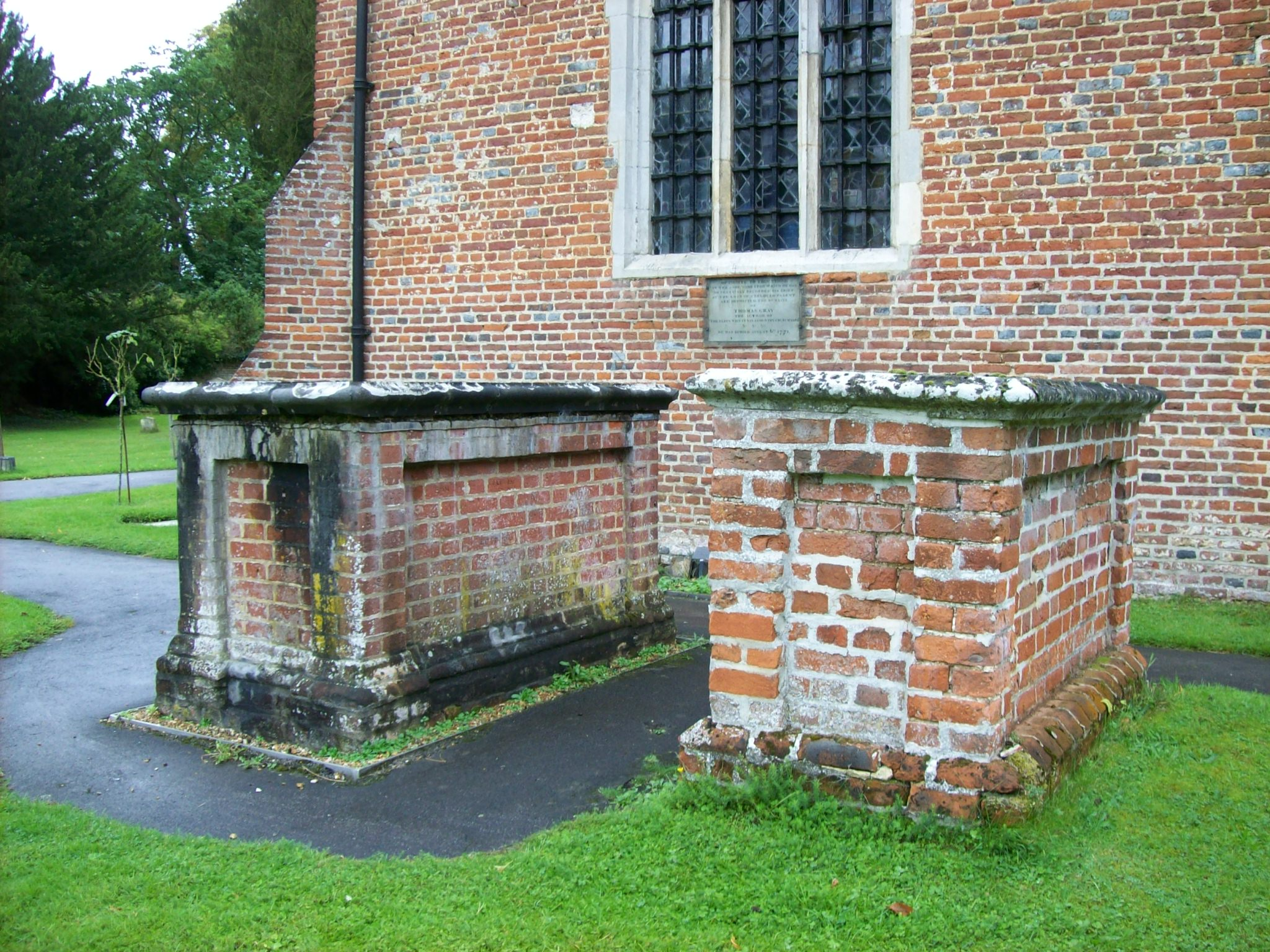
Gray's tomb, to the left

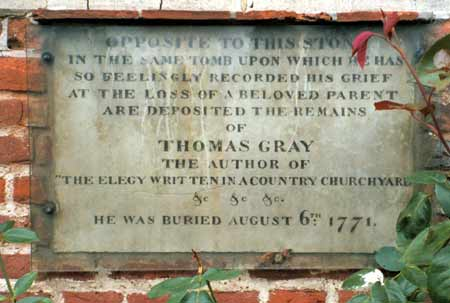
Plaque set into the wall of the Hastings Chapel opposite Gray's tomb

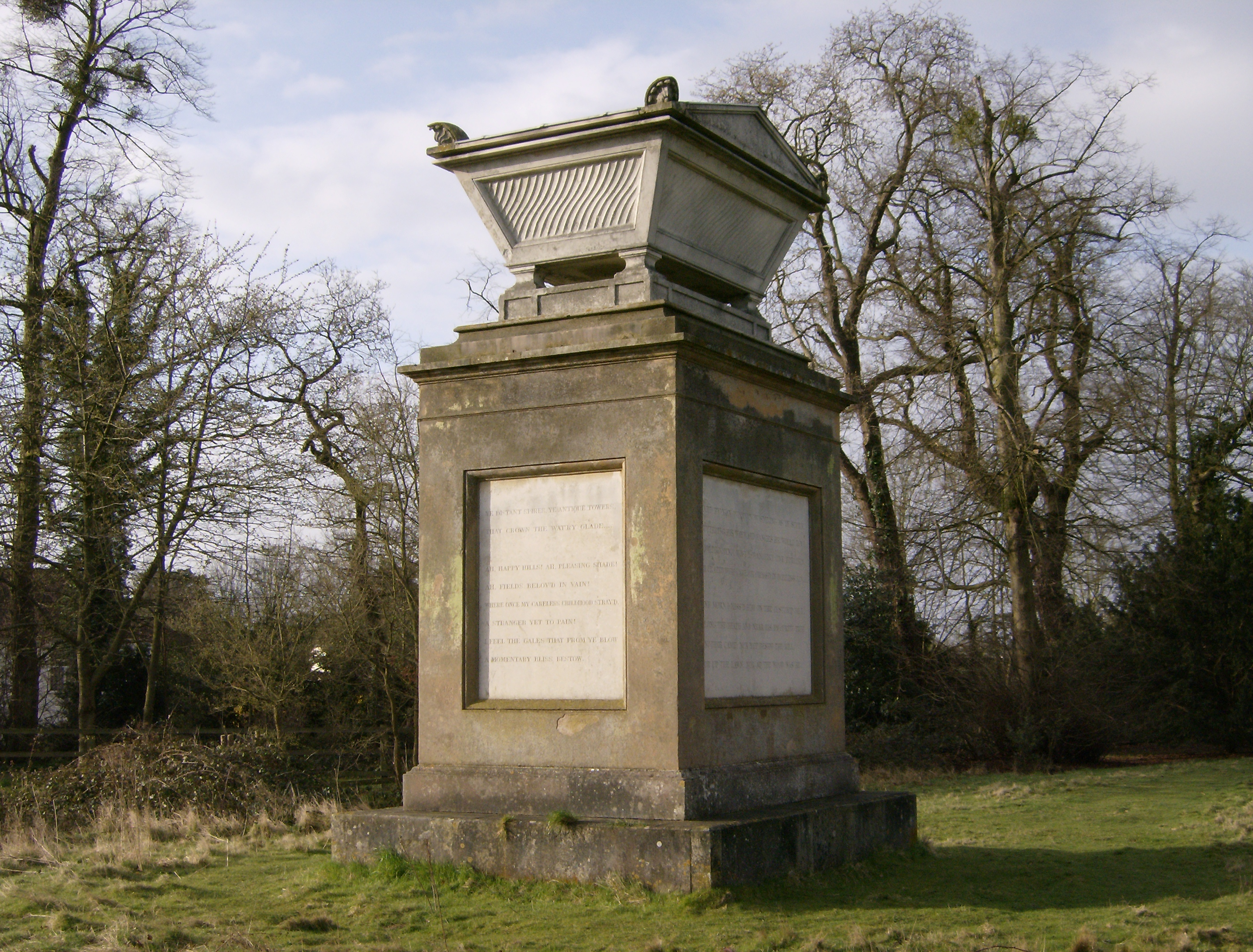
Gray's Monument

== See also ==
- Diocese of Oxford
- Grade I listed buildings in Buckinghamshire
- Oxford Diocesan Guild of Church Bell Ringers
- Stoke Park, Buckinghamshire
- Stoke Poges Memorial Gardens

== Sources ==
- Jenkins, Simon (1999). England's Thousand Best Churches. London: Allen Lane. ISBN 978-0-713-99281-6. OCLC 42004142.
- Mack, Robert (2000). Thomas Gray: A Life. New Haven, US and London: Yale University Press. ISBN 978-0-300-08499-3.
- Pevsner, Nikolaus; Williamson, Elizabeth (2003). Buckinghamshire. The Buildings of England. New Haven, US and London: Yale University Press. ISBN 978-0-300-09584-5.
- Sells, A. Lytton; Sells, Iris Esther Robertson (1980). Thomas Gray, His Life and Works. London: G. Allen & Unwin. ISBN 978-0-049-28043-4.
