= Lady Juliana Fermor Penn =

British noble (1729-1801)

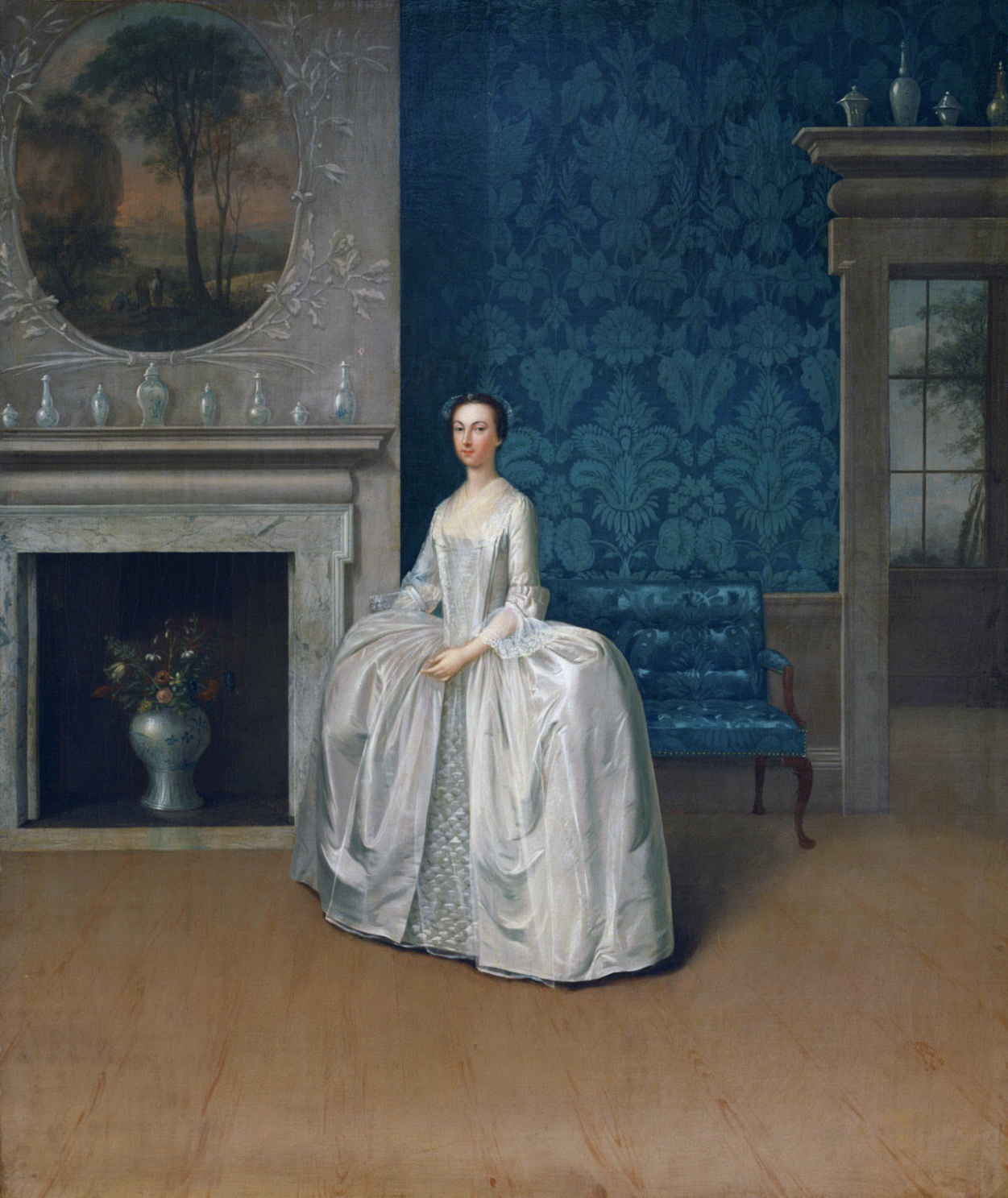
- "Lady Juliana Penn (née Fermor)" (1752) by Arthur Devis, from the Philadelphia Museum of Art
- Born: Juliana Fermor; 21 May 1729
- Died: 20 November 1801
- Known for: wife of Thomas Penn, mother of John Penn and Granville Penn

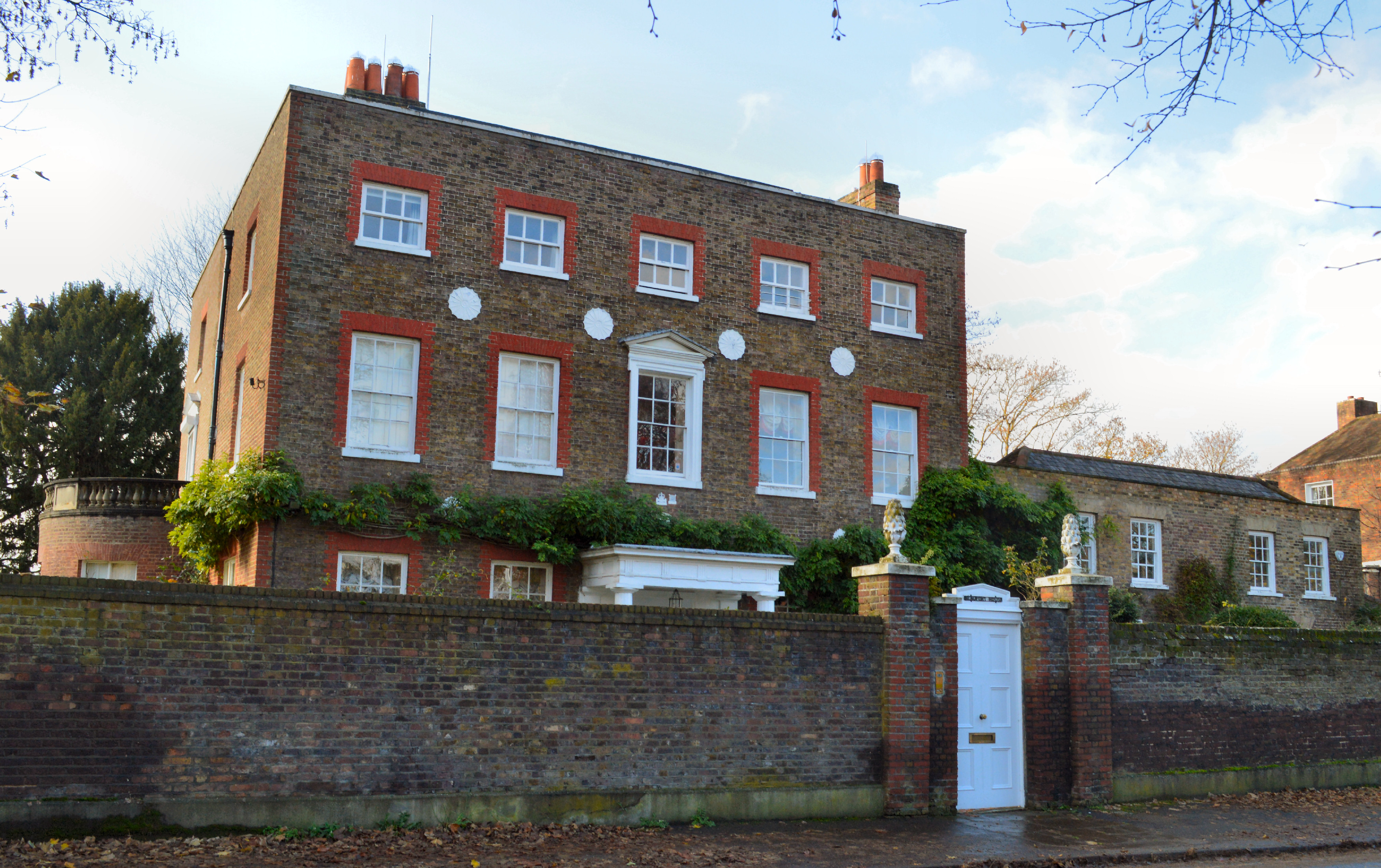
Beaufort House, Ham Street, Ham, where Lady Juliana lived and died

Lady Juliana Penn (née Fermor; 21 May 1729 – 20 November 1801) was an Englishwoman and the wife of Thomas Penn, whom she assisted in the administration of the Colony of Pennsylvania in his later years. She corresponded with John Adams and other leaders of the early United States.

== Biography ==
Lady Juliana was born in 1729 at Easton Neston, Northamptonshire, the fourth daughter of Thomas Fermor, 1st Earl of Pomfret and Henrietta Louisa Jeffreys. On 22 August 1751, she married Thomas Penn, thirty years her senior. Thomas, formerly a Quaker, attended Anglican church services regularly after their marriage, though he did not take part in the sacrament of Communion. The Penns lived at Stoke Park, Buckinghamshire. They had eight children; four died in infancy or childhood, and daughter Juliana died in childbirth at age 19.

Thomas Penn experienced declining health in the early 1770s, and as their sons John Penn and Granville Penn were still very young, Juliana took an active role in maintaining the proprietorship of Pennsylvania. She corresponded with Governor John Penn (her husband's nephew) and other colonial officials, including discussing maps and other materials of administration.

In March 1775, Thomas died; Juliana was appointed co-executor of her husband's personal estate. Soon after, events of the American Revolutionary War deprived her family of the proprietorship of Pennsylvania, on which their wealth was based, and she wrote frequently to American leaders such as Henry Laurens and John Adams about "the cause of an Innocent and Suffering Family." Penn and her co-executor William Baker took an active interest in the survey of Susquehanna Land Company holdings in the Wyoming Valley and wrote to James Tilghman expressing their hopes for a favorable outcome. The Reverend Jacob Duché wrote to Benjamin Franklin about visiting "my most Amiable Friend Lady Juliana Penn," during an official trip to England in 1783. John Jay wrote to Lady Juliana from the Treaty of Paris (1783) negotiations, to keep her apprised of their progress.

Penn died in 1801, aged 72, at Beaufort House, Ham. Her remains were buried with her husband's and with her children's, at Stoke Poges.

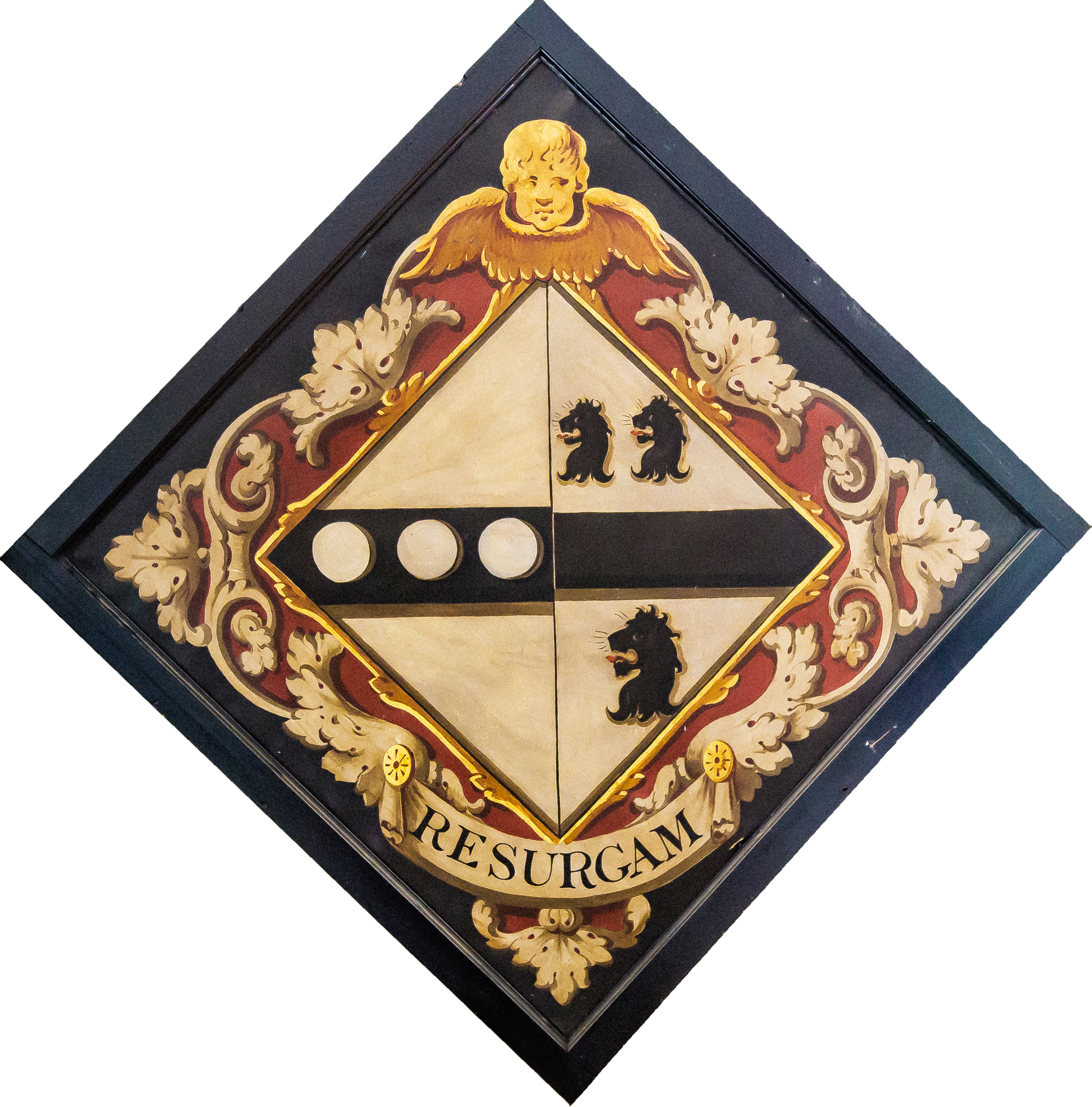
Funeral hatchment in Church of St Giles, Stoke Poges

== Legacy ==
Penn sat for three portraits by Sir Joshua Reynolds, in 1755, 1764, and 1767. A 1752 portrait by Arthur Devis is held by the Philadelphia Museum of Art. The Juliana Library Company of Lancaster, Pennsylvania was named for her in 1763, because she donated books to the subscription library's collections.

A memorial urn to Lady Juliana Penn was created by James Wyatt and commissioned by her son, John Penn. It is located in the Grade I Designated Stoke Poges Memorial Gardens, which was part of the Penn estate of Stoke Park, Stoke Poges.
