= John Penn (writer) =

English politician and writer

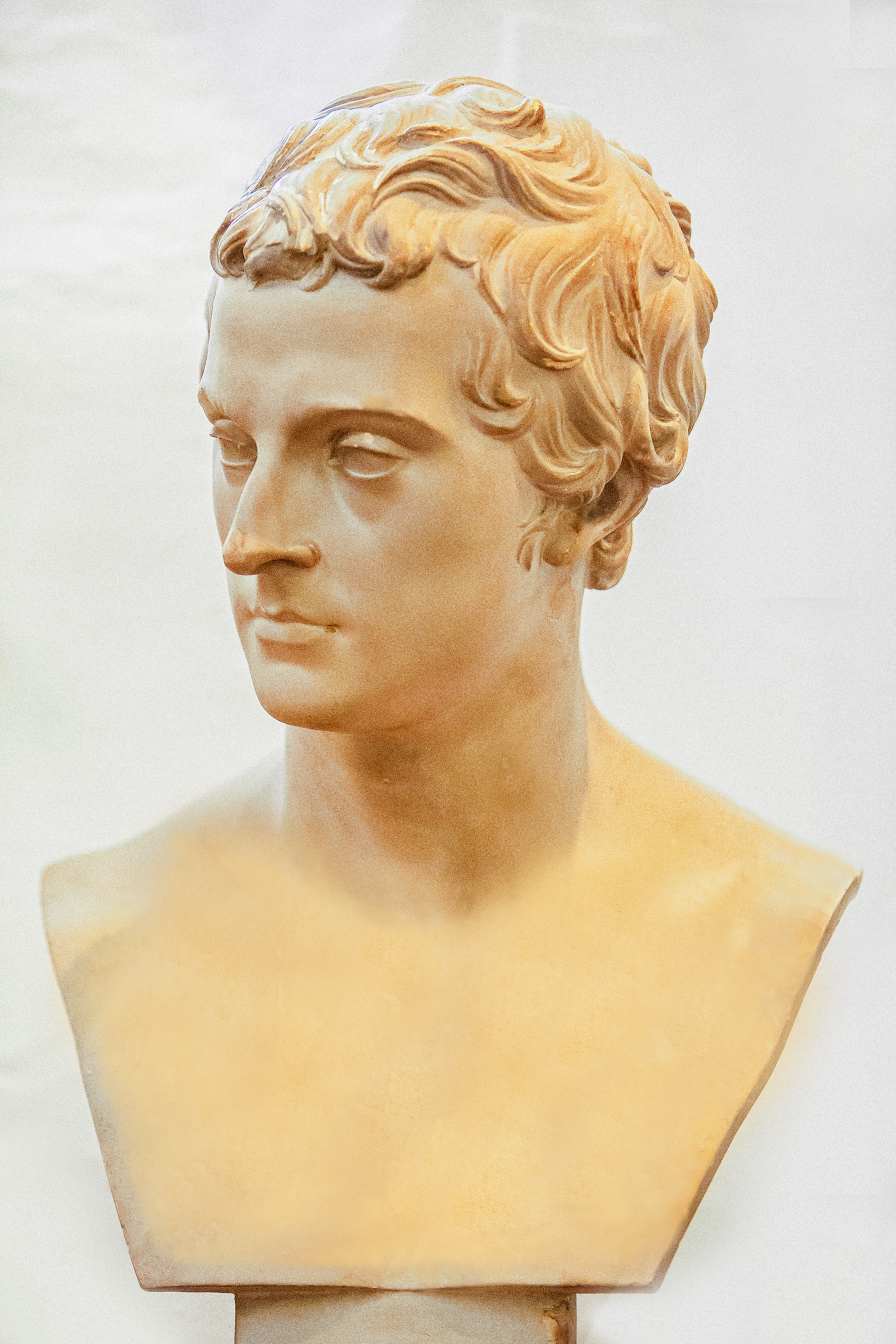
- Bust of Penn

4th Chief Proprietor of Pennsylvania
- In office 1775–1776
- Preceded by: Thomas Penn
- Succeeded by: Position abolished

Member of Parliament
- In office 1802–1805
- Constituency: Heston

Personal details
- Born: 22 February 1760 London, England
- Died: 21 June 1834 (aged 74) Stoke Poges, England
- Education: Eton College
- Alma mater: Cambridge University
- Profession: Politician and writer

John Penn (22 February 1760 – 21 June 1834) was a British politician and writer who was the chief proprietor of the Province of Pennsylvania from 1775 to 1776. He and his cousin, John Penn ("John Penn, the Governor") held unsold property, of 24,000,000 acres (97,000 km^{2}), which the Pennsylvania legislature confiscated after the American Revolution.

Penn lived in Philadelphia for five years after the Revolution, from 1783 to 1788, building a country house just outside the city. He returned to Great Britain in 1789 after receiving his three-fourths portion of £130,000, the compensation for the proprietorship by the Pennsylvania government. He and his cousin, John Penn, who remained a resident in US, received compensation from Parliament for their losses in the former colony.

In 1798, he was appointed as High Sheriff of Buckinghamshire and served as a Member of Parliament (1802–1805). He was appointed in 1805, as governor of the Isle of Portland. Also a writer, he published in a variety of genres.

== Life ==
=== Early life ===
He was born in London, England, the son of Thomas Penn and his wife Lady Juliana Fermor Penn (the daughter of Thomas Fermor, first earl of Pomfret), elder brother to Granville Penn, and a grandson of William Penn, founder of Pennsylvania. He studied at Eton College. On the death of his father in 1775, he succeeded to his father's interests, and inherited three quarters of the proprietorship of Pennsylvania. The other quarter of the proprietorship belonged to his cousin, also named John Penn, the colonial governor of the province. The Penns later lost the proprietorship as a result of the American Revolution.

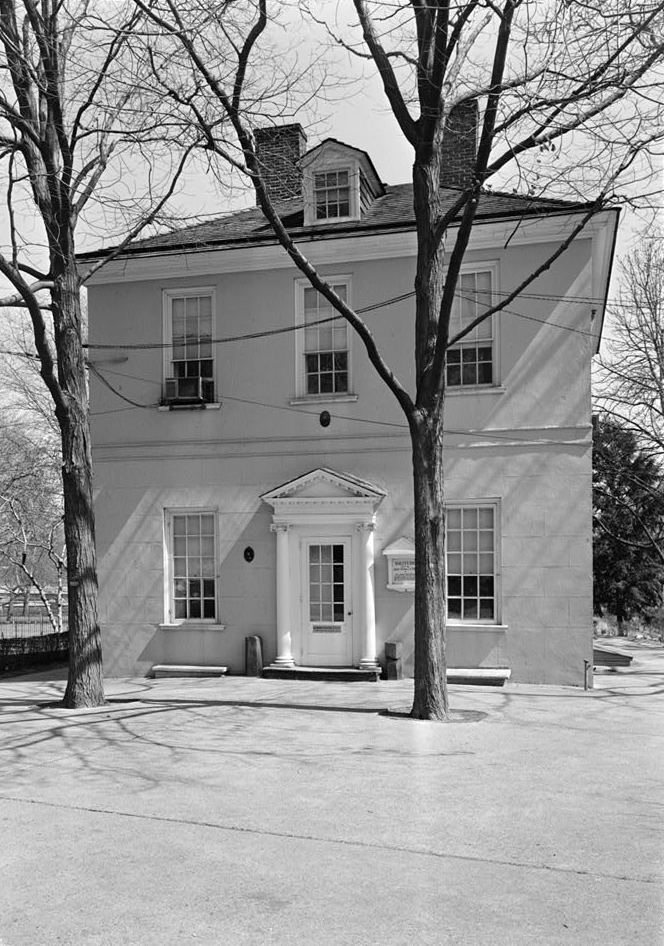
"The Solitude" (1785), designed by Penn. Now part of the Philadelphia Zoo.

In 1776, he entered Clare College, Cambridge as a fellow commoner. He made an extended visit to Pennsylvania after the Revolution, from 1783 to 1788. He rented a Philadelphia city house and designed and built a country house, The Solitude, which survives as part of the grounds of the Philadelphia Zoo.

=== Return to England ===
He returned to England in 1789 with his 75% share of the £130,000 compensation for the loss of the family's unsold property of the proprietorship in Pennsylvania, a total of 24,000,000 acres (97,000 km^{2}), which he shared with his cousin, John Penn. He rebuilt the Penn mansion in the family estate of Stoke Park. He and his cousin also appealed to Parliament for compensation and they received a total of £4,000 annually in perpetuity.

=== Political career ===
In 1798, Penn was appointed High Sheriff of Buckinghamshire. He was a Member of Parliament for Helston from 1802 to 1805.

In 1805, he was appointed as governor of the Isle of Portland, where he built Pennsylvania Castle and later the sea bathing stone bath known as John Penn's Bath, close to the gardens of the castle.

In 1818, still a bachelor at 58, Penn founded the Matrimonial Society, soon renamed the Outinian Society to encourage young men and women to marry.

==== Death ====
He died at age 74, unmarried, at Stoke Park in Stoke Poges. He was succeeded by his brother, Granville Penn.

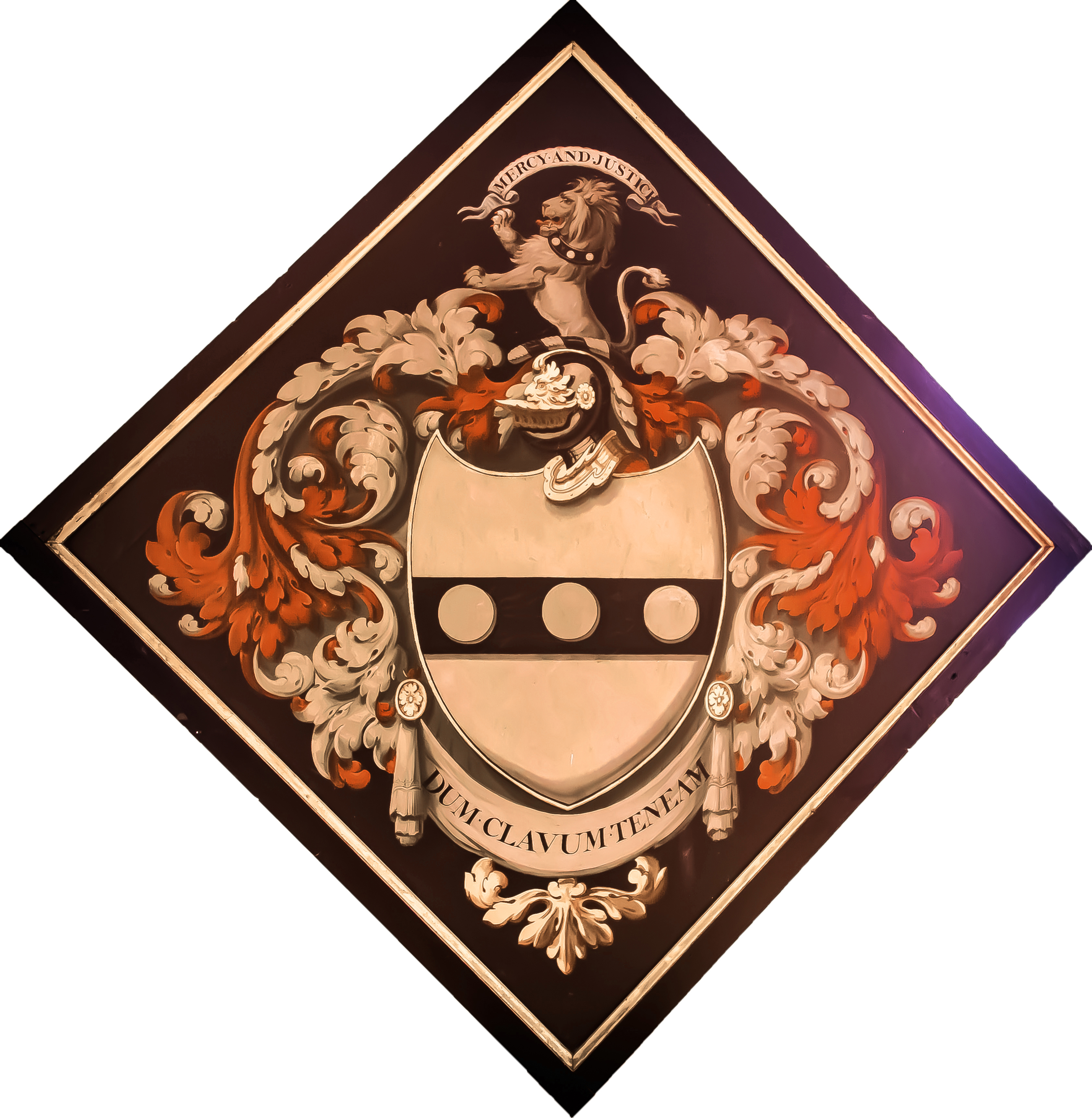
Funeral hatchment in Church of St Giles, Stoke Poges

== Selected bibliography ==
- The Battle of Eddington, or British Liberty, a 1796 tragedy
- Some pamphlets
- A collected volume of poems
- Observations in Illustration of Virgil's Celebrated Fourth Eclogue (1810). This last title is a discussion of Virgil's "Fourth Eclogue," in which Penn reasons that Virgil's eclogue is not a prophecy of the birth of Jesus Christ, as others had argued, but a Genethliacon, a birthday-poem in honour of Octavius, who became Augustus Caesar. He received the degree of LL.D. from Cambridge in 1811.

== See also ==
- List of colonial governors of Pennsylvania
- William Penn
- Pennsylvania in the American Revolution
- United Empire Loyalists

Parliament of the United Kingdom
Preceded by Charles Abbot; Lord Francis Osborne	Member of Parliament for Helston; 1802–1805; With: Viscount FitzHarris to 1804; Davies Giddy from 1804	Succeeded by Viscount Primrose; Davies Giddy
