= Allan Rowley =

(Frederick) Allan (1922–2014), army officer and intelligence officer

Frederick Allan Rowley
- Born: 27 July 1922; Rajputana, British India
- Died: 28 July 2014 (aged 92)
- Spouse: Anne Cresswell
- Relatives: Johnny Van Haeften (son-in-law)
- Military career
- Allegiance: United Kingdom
- Branch: British Army
- Service years: 1941–1974
- Unit: 5/10th Baluch Regiment
- Conflicts: World War II; Burma Campaign
- Awards: Military Cross; Order of the British Empire; Companion of the Order of St Michael and St George
- Other work: Secret Intelligence Service (MI6) controller Foreign Office diplomat

Frederick Allan Rowley, CMG, OBE, MC (27 July 1922 – 28 July 2014) was a British Army officer, Foreign Office diplomat, and Secret Intelligence Service (MI6) controller.

== Early life ==
He was born on 27 July in 1922 Rajputana, British India, the son of RQMS Rowley, Worcestershire Regiment. He was educated at Haig School, Aldershot.

== Career ==
From 1941 to 1945, Rowley served with 5/10th Baluch Regiment of the British Indian Army in India and Burma.

Rowley "developed notable leadership qualities", fighting in Burma and southeast Asia, and was "just the sort of man the Secret Intelligence Service (SIS), or MI6, was looking for", according to his obituary in The Times.

Rowley joined the Secret Intelligence Service (SIS) in 1948.

In 1963, Rowley completed a three-year secondment with the Australian Secret Intelligence Service (ASIS), and became responsible for intelligence gathering in Rhodesia, under John Debenham Taylor.

Rowley was an MI6 Controller, and the first head of the Northern Ireland Assessment Staff, a joint MI5/MI6 operation, based on the top floor of Stormont Castle, until he was succeeded in 1974 by MI5's Denis Payne.

== Honours ==
Rowley was awarded the Military Cross for his exploits in the Burmese jungle.

In the 1959 Birthday Honours Rowley, then listed as "First Secretary, Foreign Office", was awarded an OBE. In the 1978 New Year Honours, then listed as "Counsellor, Foreign & Commonwealth Office", he was awarded a CMG.

== Personal life ==
He met his future wife, the "vivacious" Anne Cresswell, an SIS secretary, at a roof party in Cairo in 1945. They had four children: Charlotte, Sarah, Joanna and Nicholas. His daughter Sarah married the art dealer Johnny Van Haeften.
