= The Battle of Eddington =

1796 play

- Original language: English
- Written by: John Penn
- Genre: Tragedy

Premiere
- Date: 28 March 1796
- Place: Theatre Royal, Haymarket, London

The Battle of Eddington: Or, British Liberty is a 1796 historical tragedy play written by the English author John Penn. It first appeared at Richmond Theatre before its West End premier at the Theatre Royal, Haymarket in London on 28 March 1796. It featured songs by the composer John Wall Callcott. It is inspired by the Battle of Edington in 874 when the English forces of Wessex under Alfred the Great defeated a Viking army. Penn dedicated the play to the prime minister of the United Kingdom William Pitt.

== Bibliography ==
- Greene, John C. Theatre in Dublin, 1745-1820: A Calendar of Performances, Volume 6. Lexington Books, 2011.
- Nicoll, Allardyce. A History of English Drama 1660–1900: Volume III. Cambridge University Press, 2009.
- Hogan, C.B (ed.) The London Stage, 1660–1800: Volume V. Southern Illinois University Press, 1968.
