= Johnny Van Haeften =

British art dealer

- Born: John Henry Van Haeften; 1952 (age 73–74); London, England
- Education: Eton College
- Occupation: Art dealer
- Known for: 16th and 17th century Dutch and Flemish Old Master paintings
- Spouse: Sarah Anne Rowley (m. 1977)
- Relatives: Allan Rowley (father-in-law); Philip Brocklehurst (great-uncle)

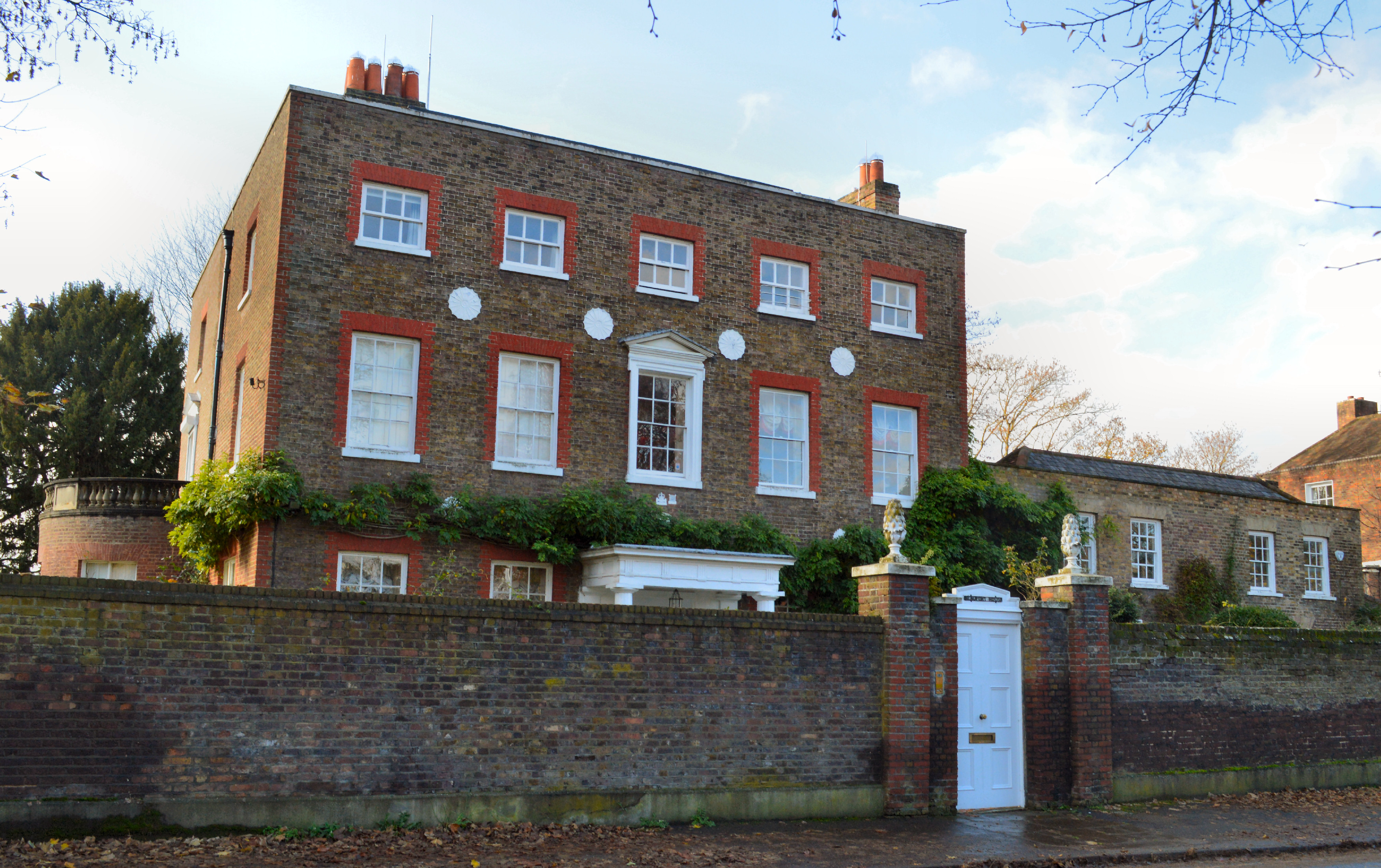
Beaufort House, Ham, where Van Haeften lives and has his gallery

John Henry Van Haeften (born 1952) is a British art dealer, who specialises in 16th and 17th century Dutch and Flemish Old Master paintings. He has been a fanatical stamp collector from a young age, specialising in the stamps of Malta, and credits stamp collecting with enabling him to develop the eye for detail that he uses in his profession. He began his career at Christie's auction house which he joined at the age of 17 where he worked on the integration of the stamp dealers Robson Lowe into the firm. He subsequently transferred to their pictures department before starting his own gallery with his wife Sarah in 1977. He estimated in 2017 that he had sold 4,800 paintings during his career.

== Early life ==
Jonkheer John Henry Van Haeften is a descendant of the Dutch Old Master painter Nicolaes van Haeften. His great-uncle Sir Philip Brocklehurst was a geologist on Shackleton's 1907–09 Nimrod Expedition to the South Pole. His grandfather married Brocklehurst's daughter in 1905, and the family has been based in England since then.

He was educated at Eton College where he was president of the philatelic society, having collected stamps from the age of about eight when he acquired a half-penny 1860 stamp of Malta. Apart from a fanatical interest in stamps, he also dreamed of opening a contemporary art gallery and when he left Eton at the age of 17 he joined Christie's auction house, feeling that the other traditional options for a young man of his type of the army or university were not suitable for him.

== Career ==
At Christie's, Van Haeften worked on integrating the stamp dealers Robson Lowe into Christie's, and in addition worked in their public relations department. He continues to collect stamps, specialising in the stamps of Malta, and has written about the Melita issue, dual-purpose postage and revenue stamps issued by the Crown Colony of Malta from 1922 to 1926. He has also given displays to members of the Malta Study Circle on the 1925 postage due stamps of that country. He has been a member of the Royal Philatelic Society London, since 2012. He only collects the stamps and mail of Malta, regarding its early engraved stamps as miniature works of art, and also owns a letter to Florence Nightingale in the Crimea that was disinfected with vinegar when it passed through Malta in order to prevent cholera being transmitted through the mail. He credits the eye for detail that he developed from collecting stamps with enabling him to appreciate the details in his chosen profession of dealing in old master Dutch paintings.

For six years Van Haeften was unable to join Christie's pictures department but he was learning about paintings and in 1975 succeeded in transferring. In 1977, he and his wife Sarah opened their first gallery, specialising in 16th and 17th century Dutch and Flemish Old Master paintings, and in 1988, he was one of the co-founders of the annual The European Fine Art Fair (TEFAF) in Maastricht, Netherlands. In 2012, The Daily Telegraph included his gallery, Johnny Van Haeften at 13 Duke Street, St. James's, in their list, "London's independent art galleries: ten of the best", and noted that the inventory included works by artists such as Gerard ter Borch, Salomon van Ruysdael and Jan Steen.

In January 2017, Van Haeften closed his Duke Street gallery after 40 years in the area, after the building's owner sold it, and informed him that the Italian art dealer Fabrizio Moretti would be moving in. Van Haeften considered taking legal action, but instead set up with reduced stock in a refurbished coach house at his home, Beaufort House, in Ham, near Richmond, Surrey. In 2017, he estimated that he had sold 4,800 paintings over the course of his career.

== Personal life ==
In 1977, he married Sarah Anne Rowley, the daughter of British Army officer, Foreign Office diplomat, and Secret Intelligence Service (MI6) controller Allan Rowley.
