= Beaufort House =

Grade II listed house in Richmond, London

Coordinates: 51.43979°N 0.31428°W

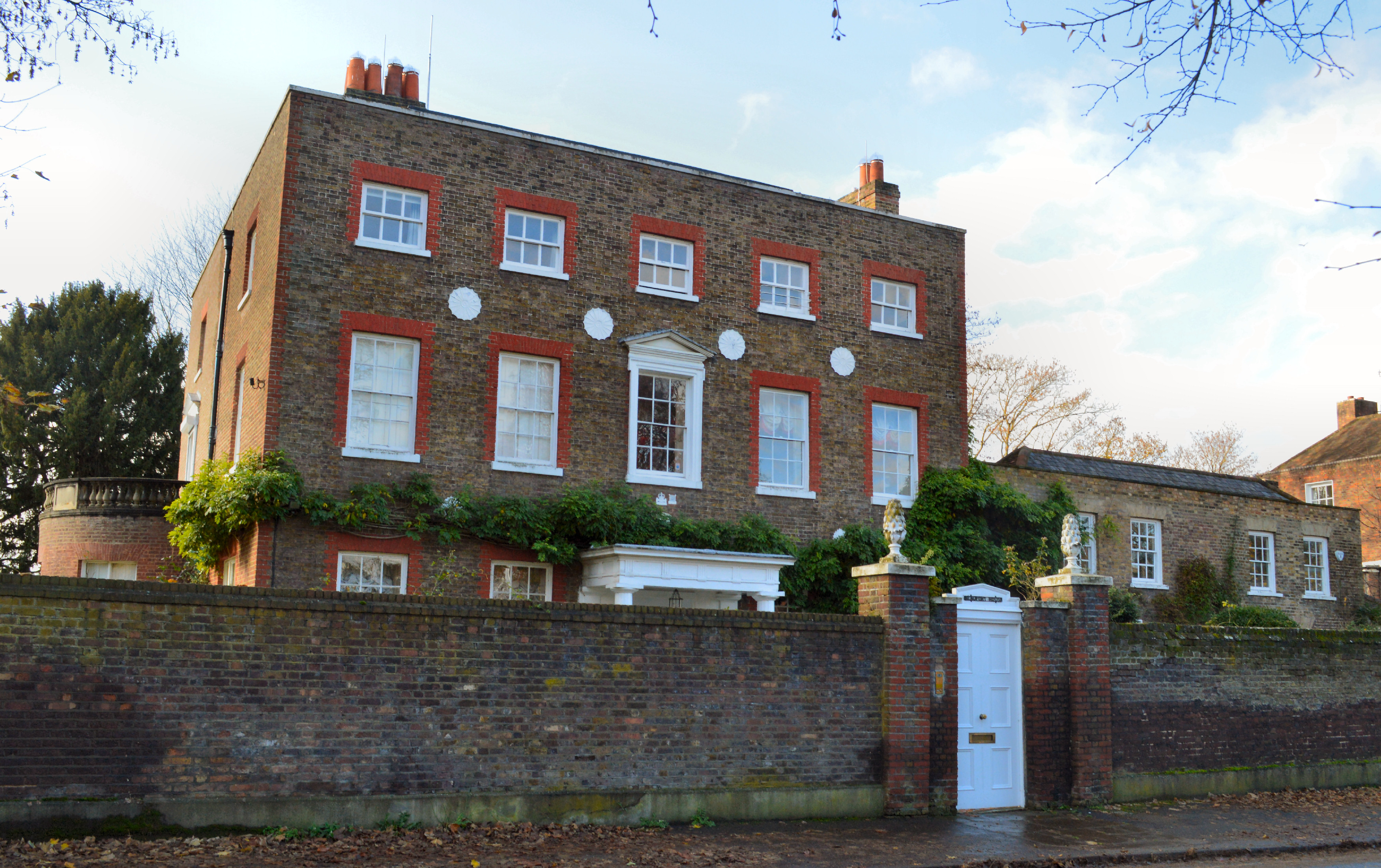
Beaufort House, Ham Street, Ham, 2020

Beaufort House is an 18th-century Grade II listed house in Ham in the London Borough of Richmond upon Thames.

== History ==
Beaufort House was built in about 1780. It was originally the dower house to Ham House.

In about 1855, a private Catholic girls' school moved to Beaufort House. In 1856, St Mary's Catholic Chapel was set up in its grounds, with a separate entrance for the public, and closed in 1870, when the school moved to Notting Hill.

The house was listed Grade II in 1983.

== Notable residents ==
Lady Juliana Fermor Penn lived there until her death in 1801. Admiral Sir William Parker, 1st Baronet, of Harburn died in 1802 at Beaufort House, which was his country estate when he was not living at 12 Crooms Hill, Greenwich.

In 1901, Dr William Simpson Craig (1822–1893), the father of the psychiatrist Sir Maurice Craig and politician Norman Craig was living there, as was Norah Palmer Holroyd, an ancestor of Michael Holroyd. From 1907 to 1920, Craig's son-in-law, Dr Macnamara (and his wife) lived there.

The house is now home to Johnny Van Haeften, a British art dealer specialising in 16th and 17th century Dutch and Flemish Old Master paintings. Van Haeften now runs his business from a refurbished coach house in the grounds of Beaufort House.
