= Stoke Park, Buckinghamshire =

House and estate in Stoke Poges, Buckinghamshire, England

Coordinates: 51.53530°N 0.60504°W

Stoke Park Country Club, Spa and Hotel
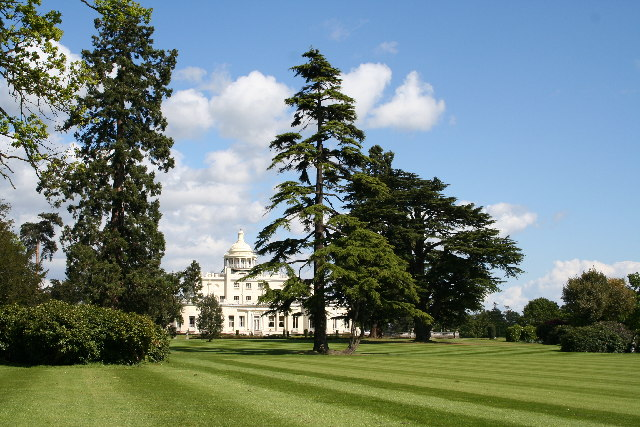

General information
- Location: Park Road, Stoke Poges, Buckinghamshire, SL2 4PG
- Opening: 1908
- Owner: Reliance Industries

Design and construction
- Architects: James Wyatt, 1788
- Developer: John Penn ("the American"), Lancelot "Capability" Brown, Humphry Repton and Nick "Pa" Lane Jackson

Other information
- Number of rooms: 49 bedrooms and suites

Website
- Official website

Stoke Park is a private sporting and leisure estate in Stoke Poges, Buckinghamshire. The mansion building (designed by James Wyatt in 1788) is located in the middle of 300 acres (1.2 km^{2}) of parkland, lakes, gardens and monuments. In 1908, the estate was converted into one of the first country clubs in the UK. In 2013, it was awarded five red AA stars, the highest accolade for service and facilities for hotels, by The Automobile Association.

Stoke Park has served as the filming location for several major films, including James Bond's Goldfinger and Tomorrow Never Dies, Bridget Jones's Diary and Layer Cake. It also hosts the annual Boodles Tennis Championships as a warm-up to Wimbledon, a week prior to the Championships.

== History ==
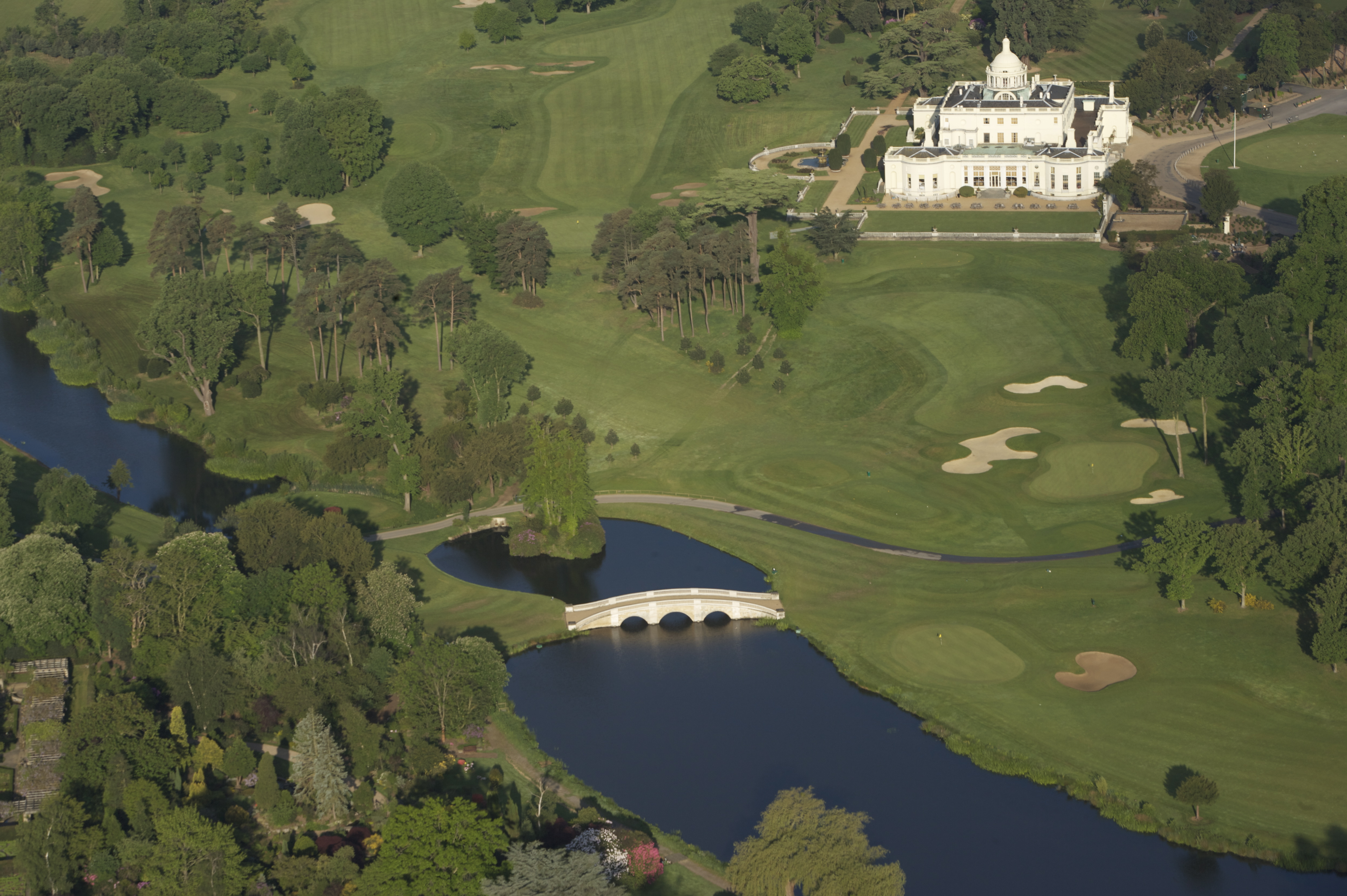
Aerial shot of the mansion and Repton Bridge

The Stoke Park estate's history dates back to the time of the Domesday Book. From 1066, the estate was inherited in a direct line of descent for 515 years until it had to be sold to the Crown in 1581 to pay the outstanding debts of Henry Hastings, 3rd Earl of Huntingdon, whose father Francis, the commander in chief of Henry VIII's army, had rebuilt the Manor House (part of which can still be seen today) in 1555.

John Penn (1760–1834), a soldier, scholar, and poet, is responsible for most of what can be seen at the estate today. He used a large proportion of the £130,000 the new United States government paid for his family's 26-million acre (110,000 km^{2}) plot in Pennsylvania.

The mansion was designed by James Wyatt (architect to George III) who worked on the development of the mansion and surrounding monuments from 1790 to 1813. The parkland was the product of two geniuses of 18th-century landscape architecture, Lancelot "Capability" Brown and Humphry Repton, who designed in 1792 the landscape that can be seen today.

=== The estate ===
The estate is listed Grade II on the Register of Historic Parks and Gardens.

In June 2014, Stoke Park hosted an outdoor charity concert for SportsAid which featured a performance by Sir Elton John.

An extensive programme of restoration was carried out following the acquisition of the estate by Reliance Industries in April 2021.

=== The club ===
The estate was used as a private residence until 1908 when Nick "Pa" Lane Jackson, founder of the Corinthian Sporting Club (Corinthian F.C.), purchased the estate and turned it into the UK's first country club. One of his initial objectives was to commission the famous amateur golfer and course architect Harry Colt (who also designed Pinevalley, Wentworth, Sunningdale, Muirfield and Royal Portrush) to design the golf course. The golf course, along with the tennis courts and the conversion of the mansion, were all completed within eight months.

In 1908, the club's first president was Prince Albert of Schleswig-Holstein and the first vice president was the Right Honourable Earl Howe. The committee also included Lord Chesterfield, Lord Kinnoull and Lord Decies.

In his 1910 book, The Golf Courses of the British Isles, Bernard Darwin wrote:

Stoke Park is a beautiful estate, and there is very good golf to be played there. There are plenty of things to do besides playing golf. We may get very hot at lawn tennis or keep comparatively cool at bowls or croquet, or, coolest of all, we may sit on the terrace or in the garden and give ourselves wholly and solely to loafing. The clubhouse is a gorgeous palace, a dazzling vision of white stone, of steps and terraces and cupolas, with a lake in front and imposing trees in every direction.

== The mansion ==
The mansion and west facing gardens

The main building is a Georgian era mansion located at the centre of the 300 acres (1.2 km^{2}) of parkland completed in 1788. The architecture of the United States Capitol, Washington D.C., which was built later, bears some resemblance to the mansion.

== The pavilion ==
Opened in 2008, the pavilion building has a health and beauty spa, swimming pool, fitness studio, gym and bedrooms and suites on the first and second floors.

== Golf ==
The Repton Bridge on Stoke Park's golf course

Stoke Park's 27 hole championship golf course was designed by Harry Colt in 1908. It was opened in July 1909 and received immediate acclaim:

If there were no palatial clubhouse and no beautiful gardens and grounds, the course itself would take a great deal of beating anywhere within thirty miles of London. Colt, to whom belongs the credit of designing it, has scored a great success and his reputation as a green architect, already high, will be greatly enhanced by this the latest of his works.

— Golf Illustrated. 1909.

Stoke Park is considered one of the "Top 100 Courses in England". It has hosted many notable tournaments, including the News of the World Match Play in 1928 and 1937, the Lotus Tournament in 1946, the Penfold Tournament in 1947, and the Agfa-Gevaert Tournament between 1963 and 1971.

== The Boodles tennis challenge ==
Stoke Park is the host of the annual Boodles Challenge, hosted the week prior to the Championships at Wimbledon. Playing on Stoke Park's grass courts, the world's best men have competed for the Boodles trophy since 2002, including Novak Djokovic, Andy Murray, Andy Roddick, Nikolay Davydenko and Juan Martín del Potro.

== Films at Stoke Park ==
Stoke Park has been the backdrop to many films and TV programmes. One of the segments of the anthology of ghost stories Dead of Night (1945) features a golf game, with an exterior shot shown of Stoke Park.

Two James Bond films, Goldfinger (1964) and Tomorrow Never Dies (1997) have been filmed at the club. The epic duel between Bond (Sean Connery) and Goldfinger (Gert Frobe) led to Sean Connery's own "lifelong love affair with golf".

The "mini break" and rowing scenes which includes Hugh Grant falling into the lake when trying to get to Renée Zellweger watched by Colin Firth and Embeth Davidtz from Bridget Jones's Diary (2001) were filmed in the mansion, lakes and The Pennsylvania Suite.

Stoke Park featured heavily in Layer Cake (2004), including the dramatic ending with Daniel Craig and Sienna Miller filmed on the mansion steps.

Guy Ritchie's RocknRolla (2008) also featured the grass tennis courts and the 21st Green.
