= Ulmus americana 'Penn Treaty' =

Elm cultivar

- Scion of the Penn Treaty Elm at the Haverford College Arboretum, planted 1915 (2017)
- Species: Ulmus americana
- Cultivar: 'Penn Treaty'
- Origin: Penn Treaty Park, Kensington, Philadelphia, US

The American elm cultivar Ulmus americana 'Penn Treaty' was raised by the Plant Sciences Data Center of the American Horticultural Society. Plants under that name were propagated by the Morris Arboretum, Pennsylvania, Philadelphia, from grafts made in 1945 from a tree at Haverford College, itself a graft, planted in 1840, from the Shackamaxon Treaty Elm – the tree under which William Penn signed his treaty with Native Americans in 1682 (felled by a storm in 1810) in what was later named Penn Treaty Park, Kensington, Pa.

== Description ==
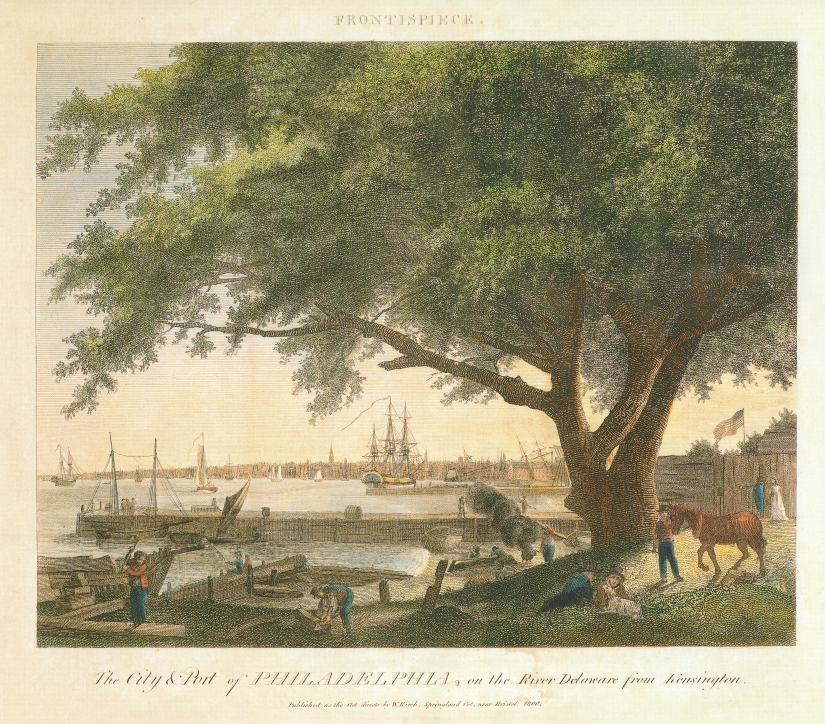
The original "Treaty Elm," Birch's Views of Philadelphia (1800).

The first elm at Haverford, planted in 1840, measured 90 ft (28 m) in height, with a crown diameter of 120 ft (37 m) 100 years later. Its surviving scion in Haverford College Arboretum is an irregularly-branched elm, unlike most selected varieties of American elm.

== Pests and diseases ==
The 1840 Haverford elm was felled in 1977 after it had succumbed to Dutch elm disease.

== Cultivation ==
Cuttings from the 1840 Haverford elm were taken in 1915 by C. Cresson Wistar, an alumnus of Haverford College, and seven scions were planted behind Barclay Hall in the arboretum. Although all but one of the resultant trees have also died, the survivor still thrives (2017). In addition, a specimen raised from seed survives on Founder's Green, Haverford College, and is perpetuated by selfed seedlings gathered by the arboretum staff in autumn. Katharine Stanley Nicholson in her Historic American trees (1922) recorded other 19th-century plantings of scions of the original tree.

The tree is not known to be in cultivation beyond North America, nor is it in commerce.

== Accessions ==
None known.
