= Petty Island =

River island in the Delaware River, US

Coordinates: 39°57′53″N 75°06′11″W

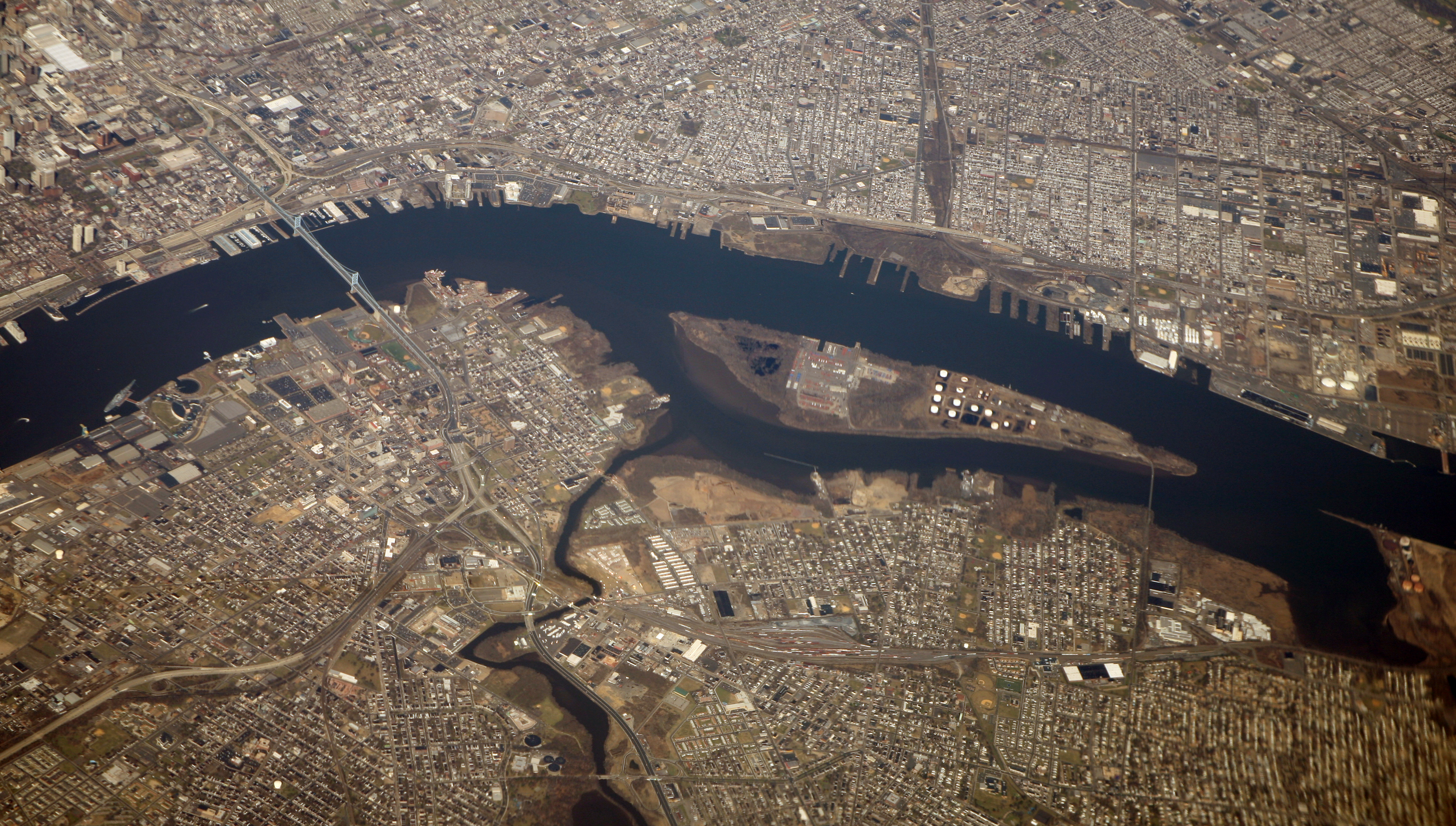
Petty Island in the Delaware River

Petty Island (also Pettys Island; or Petty's Island) is a 292-acre (1.18 km^{2}) island located in the Delaware River, which forms the border between Pennsylvania and New Jersey in the United States. The island is situated between the cities of Philadelphia, Pennsylvania and Camden, New Jersey and can be seen from both the Benjamin Franklin Bridge and the Betsy Ross Bridge. It is the fourth-largest island in the Delaware River's path. Petty Island is officially part of Pennsauken Township, New Jersey. In 2019, the State of New Jersey announced plans to buy the island, owned by Citgo, and make it a nature preserve.

== History ==
Petty Island was called "Shackamaxon Island" after the local Shackamaxon village of Lenni Lenape, "Aquikanasara" by Swedish explorer Peter Lindestrom in 1654, and "Treaty Island," the latter likely named after the Penn Treaty by the Manderson Family, who in 1852 bought most of the land. The island was originally bought from local chiefs by Elizabeth Kinsey, a Quaker who had fled persecution in England. William Penn owned the island after Kinsey; John Petty, its namesake, bought it in 1732. The island was a hotbed for gambling and dueling in the 18th and 19th centuries, and acquired a reputation for lawlessness and danger; adding to this danger was the large number of shipwrecks which occurred around the island, some of which are still visible at low tide. Ralston Laird, an Irish immigrant, moved to Petty Island in 1851 and became a farm manager there, living on the island for nearly 60 years and eventually being proclaimed its "king".

In 1971, the Philadelphia Bicentennial Planning Committee proposed using the island as a World's Fair style exposition site for the 1976 Bicentennial celebration. These plans were unsuccessful, however, and the park was never built. Petty Island is currently uninhabited, the last residential structure having burned down in 1964. It is owned by Citgo, which formerly used the island for fuel storage. Additionally, until 2018 Citgo leased portions of the island to Crowley Maritime, a shipping company. Citgo also formerly leased to Koch Industries for asphalt manufacturing. The western end of the island is undeveloped and forested.

In the early 2000s (decade), local politics in Pennsauken turned to Petty Island as a centerpiece for waterfront redevelopment, with residents and politicians hoping to install restaurants and a golf course on the island. Environmental groups opposed these measures because of a pair of bald eagles living on the island.

Venezuelan President Hugo Chávez announced in April 2009 that the Venezuelan government (owner of Citgo) would donate the island to New Jersey for environmental preservation. The New Jersey Natural Lands Trust has been granted a conservation easement for the entire island, with ownership to be transferred from Citgo to the Natural Lands Trust by 2022, when the cleanup of the island's former petroleum operations is complete.
