= Penn's Treaty with the Indians =

Painting by Benjamin West

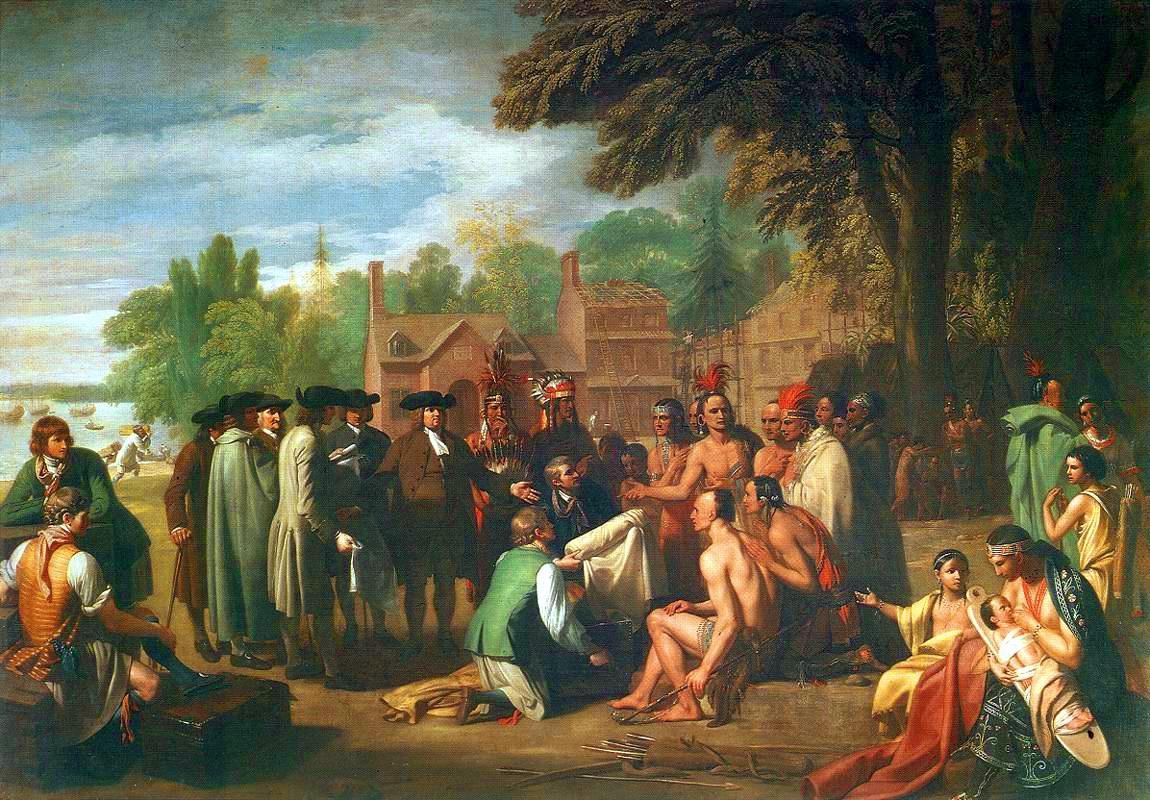
The Treaty of Penn with the Indians, a portrait by Benjamin West completed in 1772

The Treaty of Penn with the Indians, sometimes known as Penn's Treaty with the Indians at Shackamaxon or more simply Penn's Treaty with the Indians, is an oil painting by Benjamin West, completed in 1771–72. The painting depicts William Penn entering into the Treaty of Shackamaxon in 1682 with Tamanend, a chief of the Lenape ("Delaware Indians") Turtle Clan, under the shade of an elm tree near the village of Shackamaxon (now Kensington) in Pennsylvania.

The peace between the Lenape Turtle Clan and Penn's successors would endure for over 70 years, until the Penn's Creek Massacre of 1755.

The treaty William Penn entered into was remarked upon by Voltaire, who called it "... the only treaty never sworn to and never broken."

== Painting ==
The painting was commissioned in 1770 or 1771 by Thomas Penn, one of three sons of William Penn. It was completed in 1771–72. West was a local artist who was born in Springfield, Pennsylvania and grew up in Swarthmore, Pennsylvania in suburban Philadelphia. Like Thomas Penn, West was born into a Quaker family. Also like Thomas Penn, he later turned to the Church of England. He studied in Philadelphia but developed as a painter of historic subjects in London, where he was the second president of the Royal Academy of Arts. His reputation for history painting was established in the early 1770s with his painting of The Death of General Wolfe.

For the image of William Penn, West copied a relief portrait made from memory by Silvanius Bevan several years after Penn's death. West had no models for the native subjects, so used sketches of sculptures, adding native artifacts, such as beaded moccasins, arm bands, and bags, and clay pipes.

The crowd is gathered around a white cloth which draws the eye at the center of the composition, like a campfire or the Christ child at the centre of a nativity scene. The painting presents an idealized picture of interaction between the natives and the Europeans, glossing over recent difficulties such as the Walking Purchase in 1737 and the Treaty with the Six Nations in 1744, but harking back instead to Penn's wish for peace.

The muscular natives are dressed and decorated in green, red and white, with feather headdresses, partly shaved heads, beaded armbands and headbands, and large earrings. They lean forward, keen to see what they are being offered. Original items of clothing that were used as a model for portraying Native Americans in the painting can be found in the British Museum's collection (as well as additional indigenous artefacts used in other paintings by West).

The Europeans are shown in more somber clothing typical of 1771, in shades of browns and greys, rather than the more decorated styles of 1682; Penn is picked out by his white neckcloth. The Europeans stand back, reversing their contemporary keenness to acquire land from the natives. The crowd includes West's own father (the elderly gentleman with white hair, third to left of Penn) and his half brother Thomas West (behind Penn). West also added brick-built buildings from his own memories of Pennsylvania, even though they had not been built by 1682.

The canvas measures 190 centimetres (75 in) high by 274 centimetres (108 in) wide.

The painting was purchased at auction by Joseph Harrison and brought to Philadelphia. On Harrison's death, it was given to the Pennsylvania Academy of the Fine Arts and the United States National Museum of Independence. It has been exhibited at the State Museum of Pennsylvania in Harrisburg, Pennsylvania, the state capital.

== Prints ==
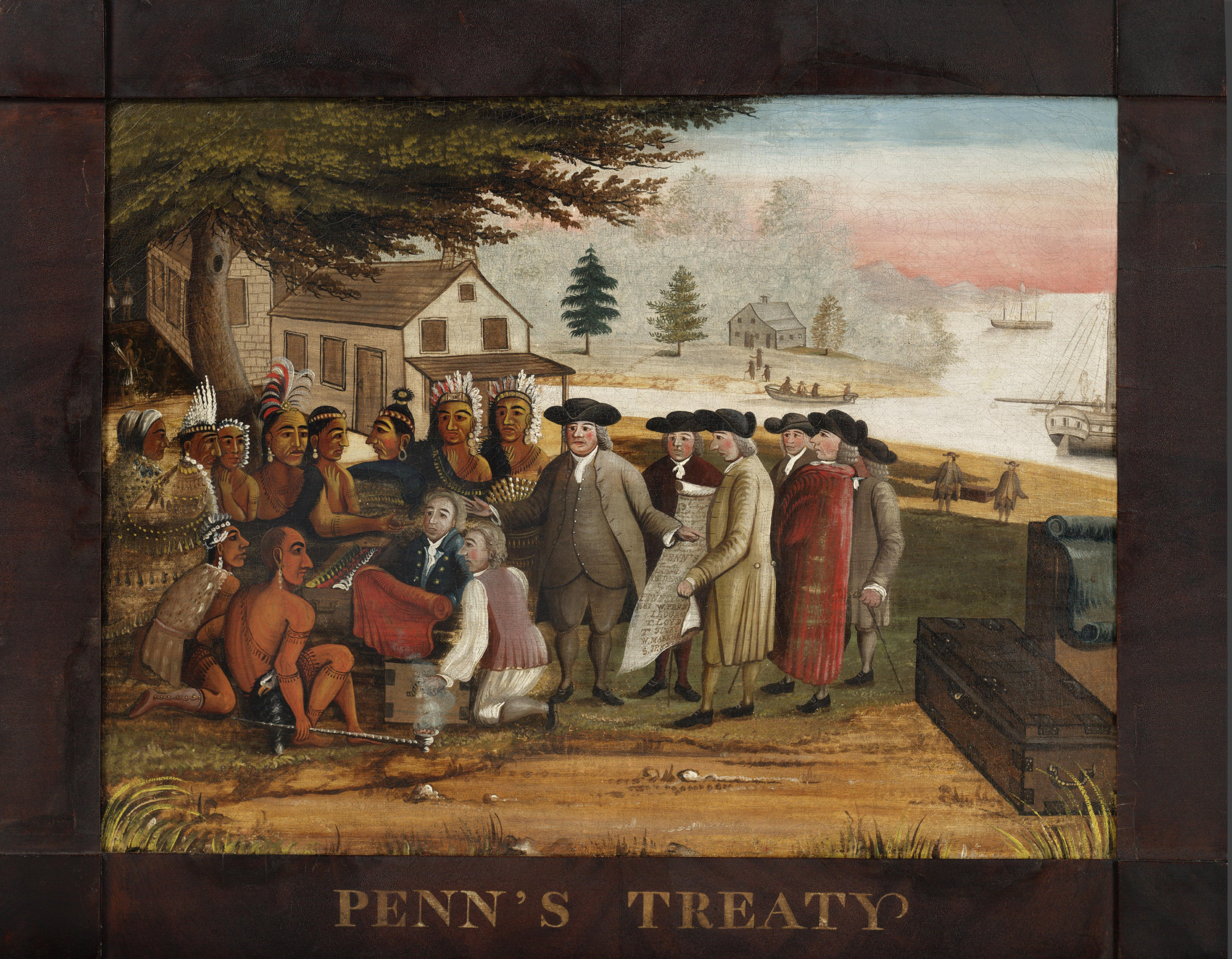

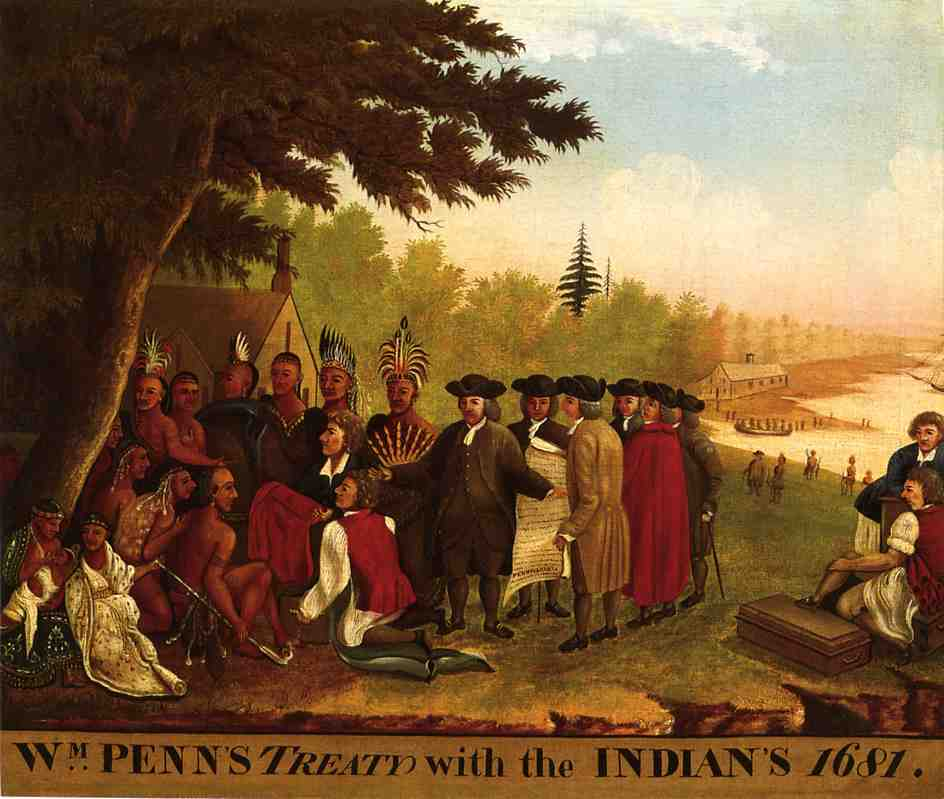

A copperplate print of the painting was engraved in London by John Hall and published by John Boydell in June 1775, with the image reversed, under the longer title William Penn's treaty with the Indians, when he founded the province of Pennsylvania in North America, 1681. The print was copied in a smaller size by Robert Delaunay and published as Guillaume Penn Traite avec les Indiens. This French print was copied by other artists.

The tree itself also became a subject for later paintings and prints, although it fell during a storm on 3 March 1810. The land is now Penn Treaty Park. The painting influenced folk artist Edward Hicks, who made his own image of the events.
