= John Hall (British artist) =

British engraver and painter (1739–1797)

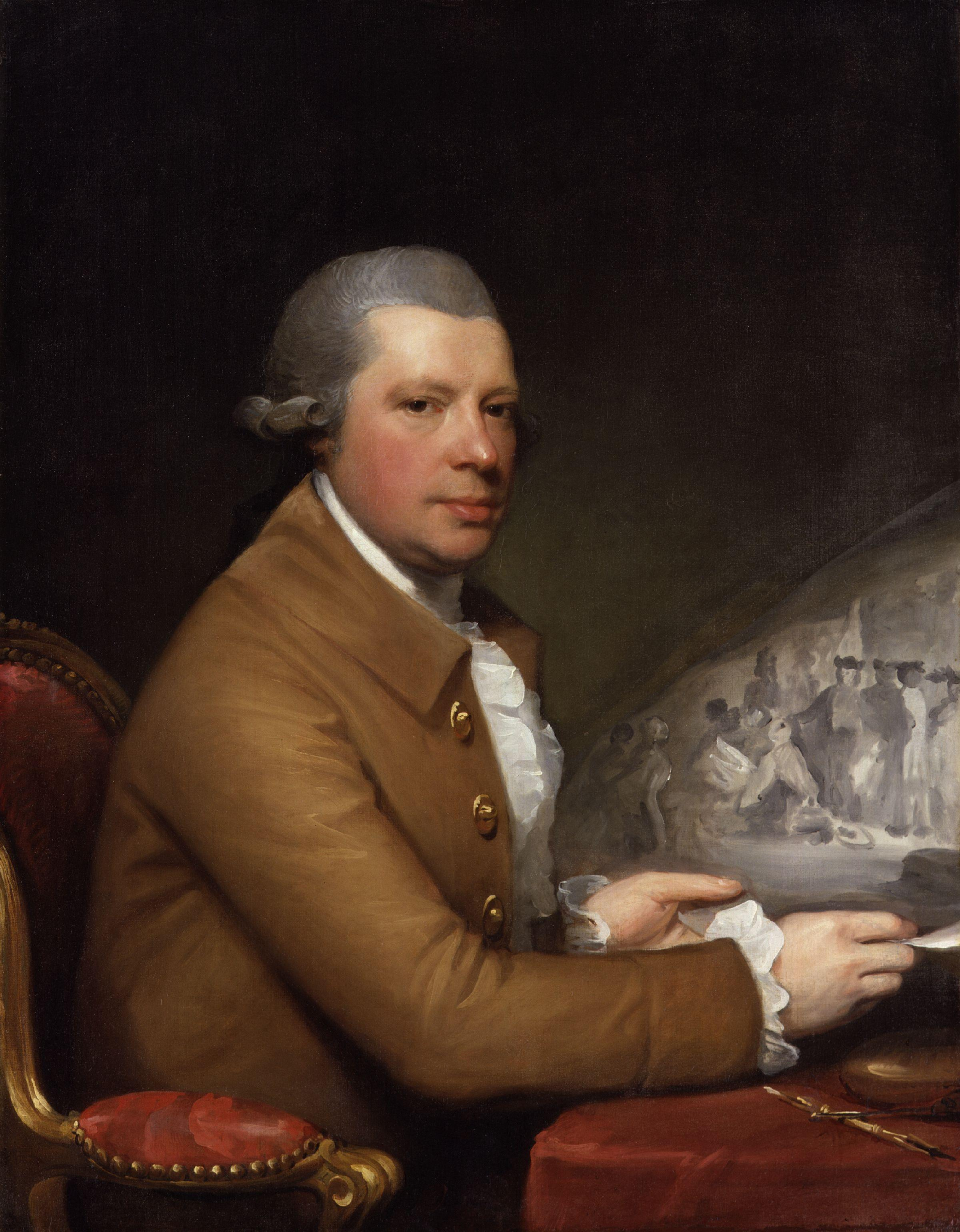
Gilbert Stuart's 1785 portrait of Hall with his engraving of Penn's Treaty with the Indians

John Hall (21 December 1739 – 1797) was a British engraver and painter.

Hall was born in Wivenhoe, near Colchester, in 1739. He studied under the French immigrant engraver Simon François Ravenet. A fellow student was William Wynne Ryland, later executed for forgery. In 1756 and 1761, he won prizes from the Society for the Encouragement of Arts, Manufactures and Commerce.

Hall was appointed a fellow of the Society of Artists in 1765, later serving as its director (an annual appointment requiring election). He was elected director in 1768, 1769 and 1771. In 1785 he was appointed historical engraver to George III, following the death of William Woollett.

He engraved a number of portraits, including one of Richard Brinsley Sheridan painted by Joshua Reynolds. He also engraved the plates for Bell's British Theatre. This included illustrations of scenes, created by Hall himself, and portraits of actors performing well-known roles. Hall created the earliest visual image of Hamlet holding Yorick's skull, with his 1773 engraving (after a design by Edward Edwards) in Bell's edition of Shakespeare's Plays.

Hall was also a painter, though he was typically a copyist, working in a stiff old-fashioned style.

A portrait of Hall by Gilbert Stuart depicts him with his engraving of Benjamin West's painting Penn's Treaty with the Indians. This was published by John Boydell in June 1775, with the image reversed, under the longer title William Penn's treaty with the Indians, when he founded the province of Pennsylvania in North America, 1681.
