= Lappawinsoe =

Lenape Chief

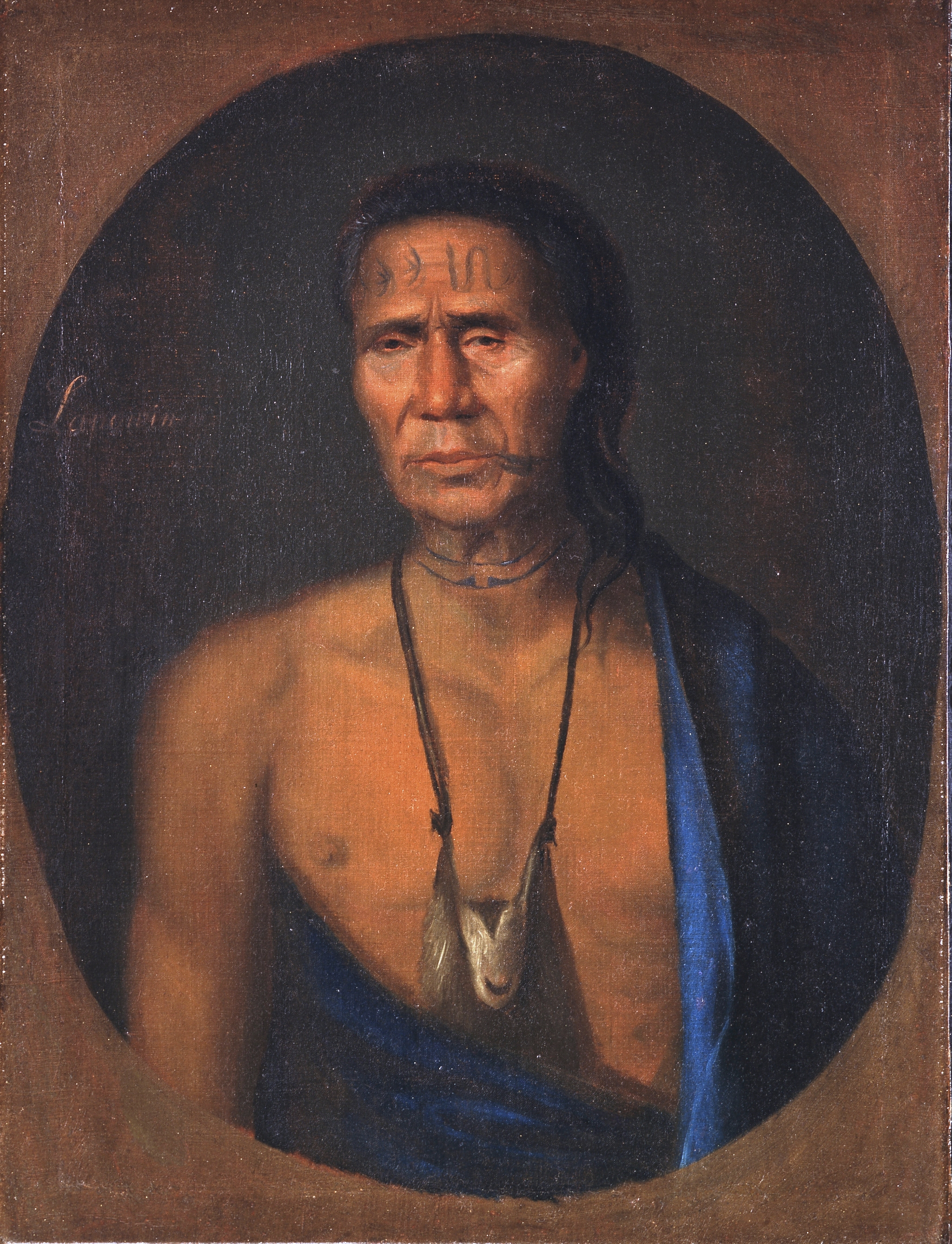
- Lappawinsoe, painted by Gustavus Hesselius

Lenape (Delawares) leader

Personal details
- Known for: Signing the Walking Purchase agreement for land cession of 1737 with the sons of William Penn

Lappawinsoe /ˌlæpəˈwɪnzoʊ/ was a Lenape chief. His name signifies "gathering fruit" or "going away to gather food". Lappawinsoe sold the land of his tribe to Thomas Penn (1702–1775), and John Penn ("the American") (1700–1746), the sons of William Penn (1644–1718), the founder, with moderate Quaker philosophies of the Colony and Province of Pennsylvania in 1681 (later the American state – Commonwealth of Pennsylvania after 1776), through the controversial and disputed Walking Purchase treaty agreement of 1737. Three other Lenape-Delaware chiefs also signed the agreement: Tishecunk (sometimes referred to as Tishcohan, "tash-suk-amen" meaning "he never blackens himself"), Nutimus ("striker of fish with a spear") and Menakihikon ("a King of the Minissincks"). Documentation shows that Nutimus was considered the principal Indian leader of the tribes located further southeast in the future State of Delaware.

== Portrait ==
It is documented that Lappawinsoe was the first Native American who was portrayed in an oil painting. Lappawinsoe and Tishecunk are considered "the only two chiefs of the Lenni Lenape whose portraits have been preserved". In his portrait, Lappawinsoe is shown as a muscular man of about 40 years of age. Further descriptions of the painting focus on the tattoos on Lappawinsoe's face and neck as well as on the pouch he is wearing. The pouch is compared to the one worn by Tishcohan in his respective painting. The tattoos on Lappawinsoe's forehead symbolize two thunderbirds and a snake or serpent. Body tattoos are used to represent information about the person's character and their beliefs. The Thunderbird is considered a "powerful spirit being" and signifies an "active and swift-footed warrior".

== Walking Purchase Agreement ==
In 1737, Lappawinsoe signed the Walking Purchase agreement to sell part of his tribe's land in the eastern border area of the colonial Province of Pennsylvania along the upper northern reaches of the Delaware River with the neighboring West New Jersey colonial grant further east of the Province of New Jersey (later after the American Revolutionary War (1775–1783) as the State of New Jersey) "extending as far west as a man could walk in a day and a half". An attributed quote states: "Chief Lappawinsoe, believing the treaty genuine and assuming a man could only walk about 40 miles, agreed to the Walk!". William Penn's sons, Thomas Penn (1702–1775) and John Penn (1700–1746), convinced the Lenape that their father had already bought the land from them. Contrary to Lenape belief, the two brothers Thomas Penn, John Penn - ("the American") and provincial official James Logan had arranged and hired fast runners to run a prepared path which resulted in a scheme for a bigger landloss for the Lenape than they had ever imagined. Edward Marshall, one of the three walkers and the only one who completed the full walk, states in a testimony in 1751 that Lappawinsoe was living in the Indian town Hockendocqua (also referred to as Hociundoquen). When he was passing the place during the walk asking Lappawinsoe for an Indian to come with him, he said "they had got all the best land, and they might go to the Devil for the bad" and that he would send no Indian with them. Furthermore, Lappawinsoe is said to have described the walk as not "fairly performed" and "no sit down to smoke, no shoot a squirrel, but lun, lun, lun all day long!"

The Lenni Lenape had a longtime friendly relationship with William Penn, including several fair treaties they made with him. Over the years, this led to a good reputation of the Pennsylvania government among the Lenape people. Part of the reason the Lenape chiefs signed the Walking Purchase treaty was also to honor this peaceful relationship with William Penn who had died 19 years before.

== Quotation ==
[The white runners] should have walkt along by the River Delaware or the next Indian path to it… should have walkt for a few Miles and then have sat down and smoakt a Pipe, and now and then have shot a Squirrel, and not have kept up the Run, Run all day.

== See also ==
- Oratam
