= Gustavus Hesselius =

Swedish-born painter (1682-1755)

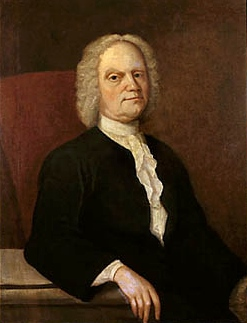
- Born: Gustaf Hesselius c. 1682; Folkärna, Dalarna, Swedish Empire
- Died: May 23, 1755; Philadelphia, Province of Pennsylvania, British America
- Known for: Painting

Gustavus Hesselius (c. 1682 – May 23, 1755) was a Swedish-born painter. He was European trained and became a leading artist in the mid-Atlantic colonies during the first half of the eighteenth century. He was among the earliest portrait painters and organ builders in the United States. He was named to the Prince George's County Hall of Fame by the Prince George's County Historical Society.

== Biography ==
Hesselius was born in Folkärna parish at Avesta in Dalarna County, Sweden. He was the son of Andreas Olai Hesselius (1644–1700) and his wife Maria Bergia (c. 1658–1717). His father was the vicar at Folkärna Church. His mother was the sister-in-law of Jesper Swedberg (1653–1735), Bishop of the Diocese of Skara and aunt of religious leader Emanuel Swedenborg.

Hesselius had studied art in Sweden and probably in England. He came to Wilmington, Delaware in 1711 together with his elder brother Andreas Hesselius (1677–1733). His brother had been appointed to become parish priest of Holy Trinity Church, the Swedish Lutheran parish at Fort Christina.

He lived in Delaware until 1717, then moved to Philadelphia where he lived until 1721. In 1721, he moved to Prince George's County, Maryland and became a portrait painter. That same year, he received the first recorded public art commission in the American colonies; he painted The Last Supper. He also painted a Crucifixion. Some time around 1735, Hesselius returned to Philadelphia where he spent the rest of his life.

He also worked as an organ builder, having built an organ for the Moravian Church in Bethlehem, Pennsylvania in 1746. From about this time on, he focused on building organs with the assistance of John Clemm (1690–1762). He referred painting commissions to his son John.

== Personal life ==
Gustavus Hesselius was married to Lydia Getchie (1684–1755). He was the father of painter John Hesselius (1728–1778). His granddaughter Elizabeth Henderson was married to artist Adolf Ulrik Wertmüller (1751–1811). Hesselius was listed as a member of the Gloria Dei (Old Swedes') Church in Philadelphia. He died on May 23, 1755 in Philadelphia, Pennsylvania and was buried at Gloria Dei Church.

== Style ==
While most of his portraits adhere to the formality typical for American portrait painting of his time, according to Michael J. Lewis, his portrait of Lappawinsoe, chief of the Lenape, was among the first to foreshadow "the sympathetic and unaffected realism" that would later develop in American portraiture. The painter was able to ignore the rigid conventions of colonial society because Lappawinsoe was a member of a First Nation.

== The Last Supper ==
The Last Supper by Gustavus Hesselius was the first recorded public art commission in the American colonies. Commissioned in October 1721, it is displayed on the choir gallery of St. Barnabas Church, Upper Marlboro, Maryland. Before this, most painting in the new world had been portraits. The Last Supper was the first significant American painting to depict a scene.

The painting which measures 35 inches by 117½ inches was commissioned for an older church built in 1710, and remained there until the present structure was built in 1774. It disappeared during the construction of the new Brick Church and did not surface again until it was discovered in a private collection in 1848 or 1914, when Charles Henry Hart identified it, depending on which source one follows.

It was on loan by Rose Neel Warrington for a period at the Philadelphia Museum of Art and at the American Swedish Historical Museum as well as the Exhibition of Early American Paintings at the Brooklyn Institute of Arts and Sciences in 1917 and the Wilmington Society of the Fine Arts. The painting was willed once again to St. Barnabas upon Warrington's death.

== Gallery ==
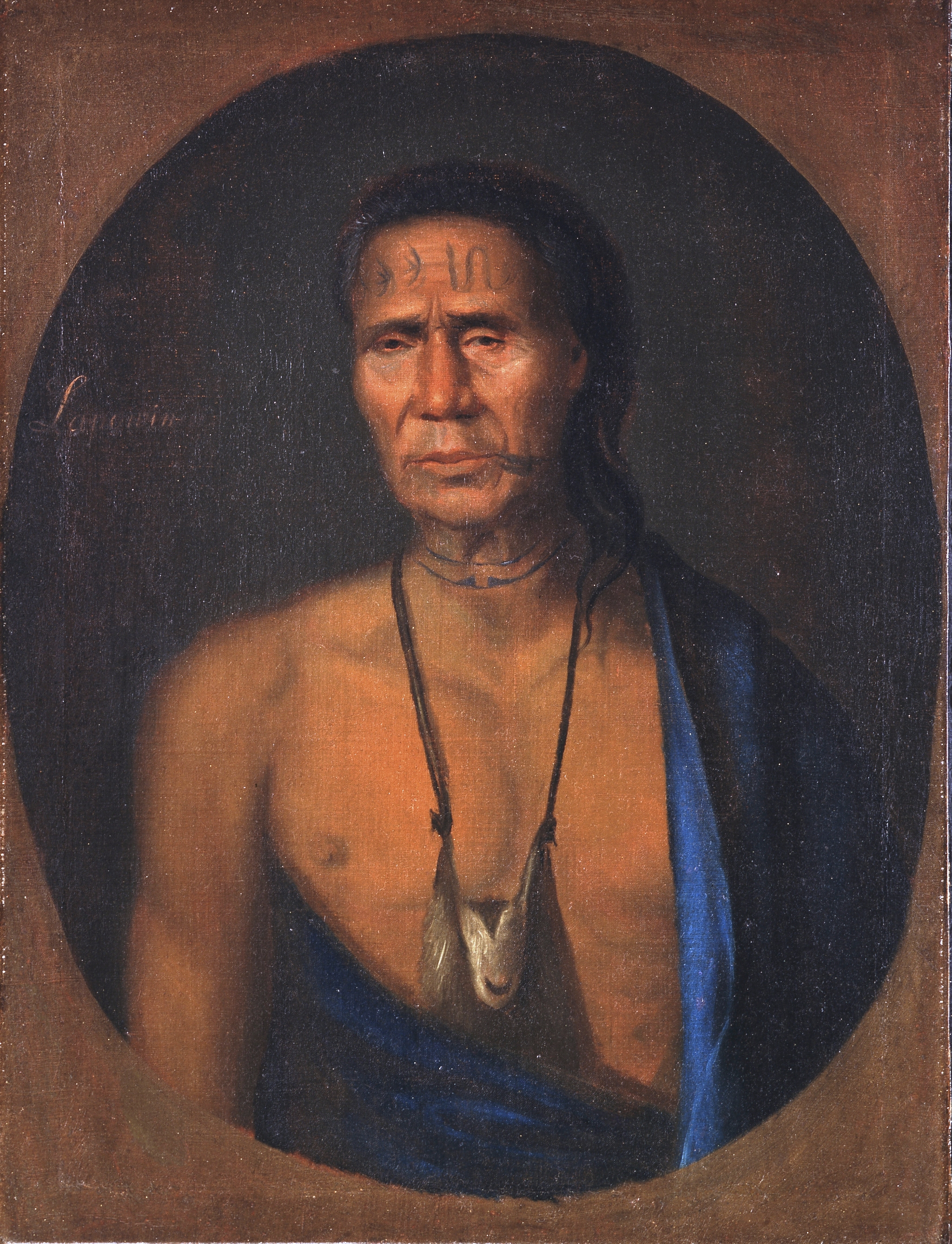
Portrait of Lappawinsoe, (1735).

Portrait of Benjamin Fendall I

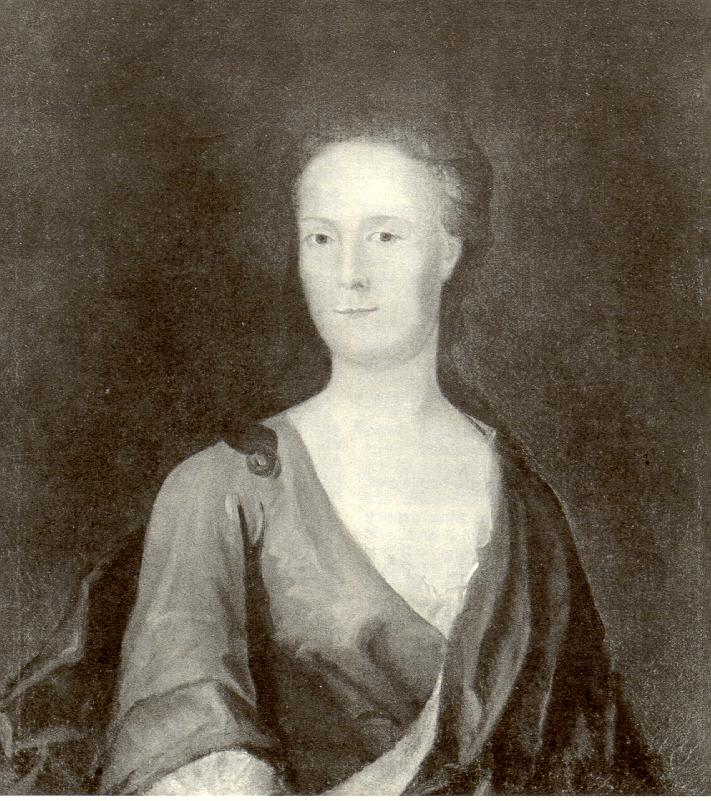
Portrait of Eleanor Fendall

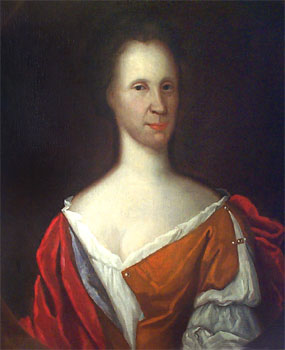
Portrait of Mary Darnall Carroll

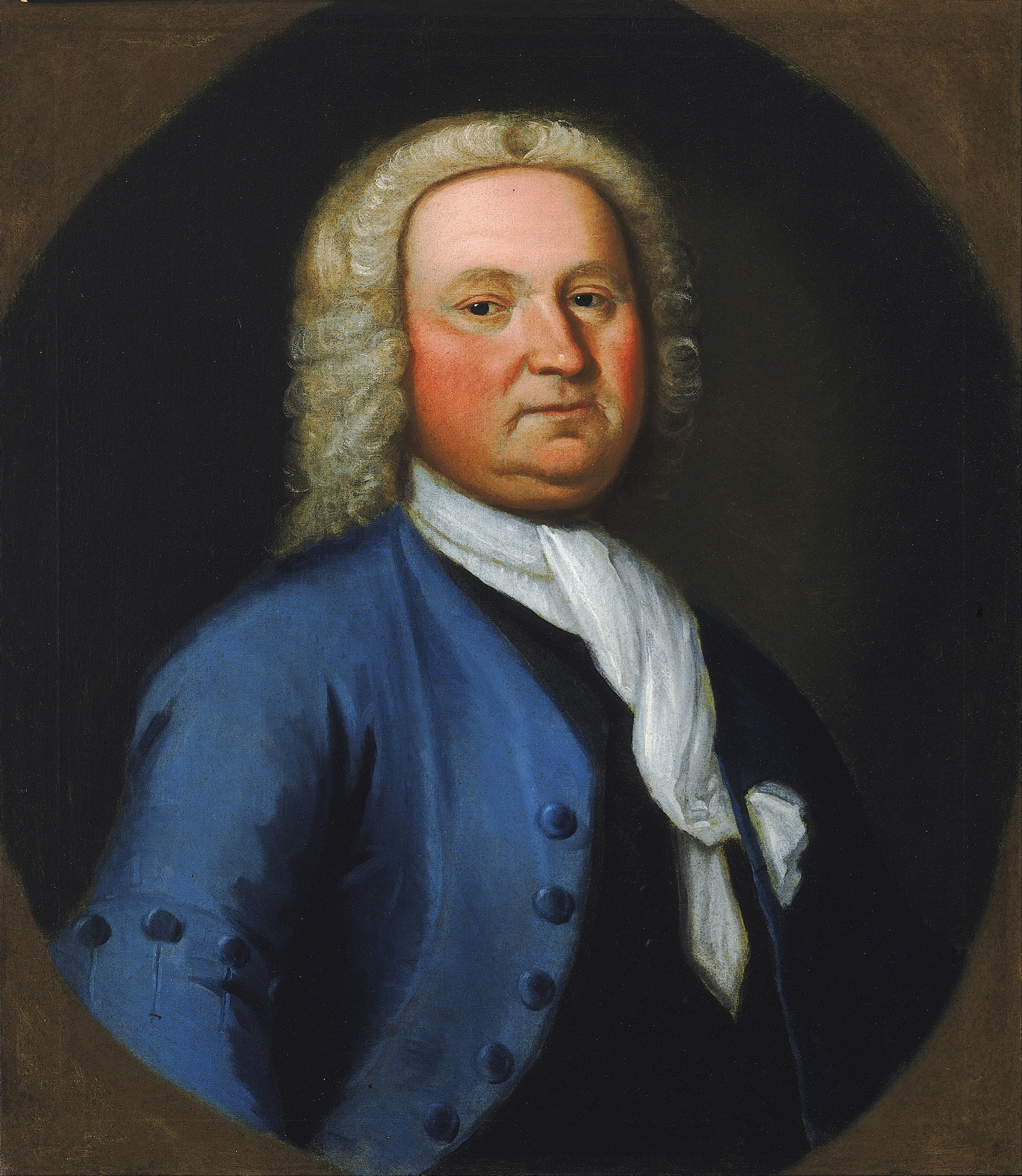
Portrait of Dr. Gustavus Brown; attributed to Gustavus Hesselius

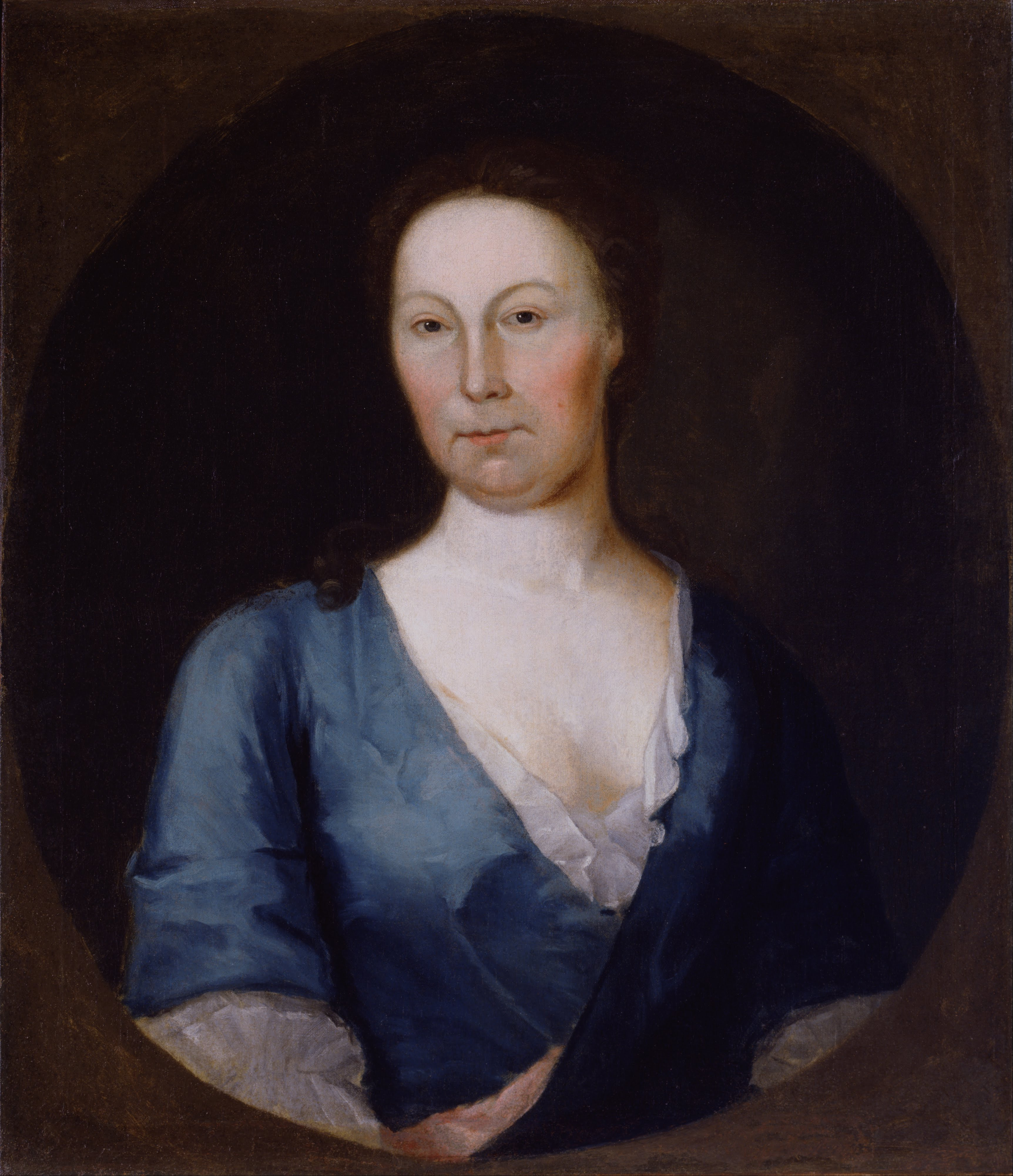
Portrait of Mrs. Gustavus Brown; attributed to Gustavus Hesselius

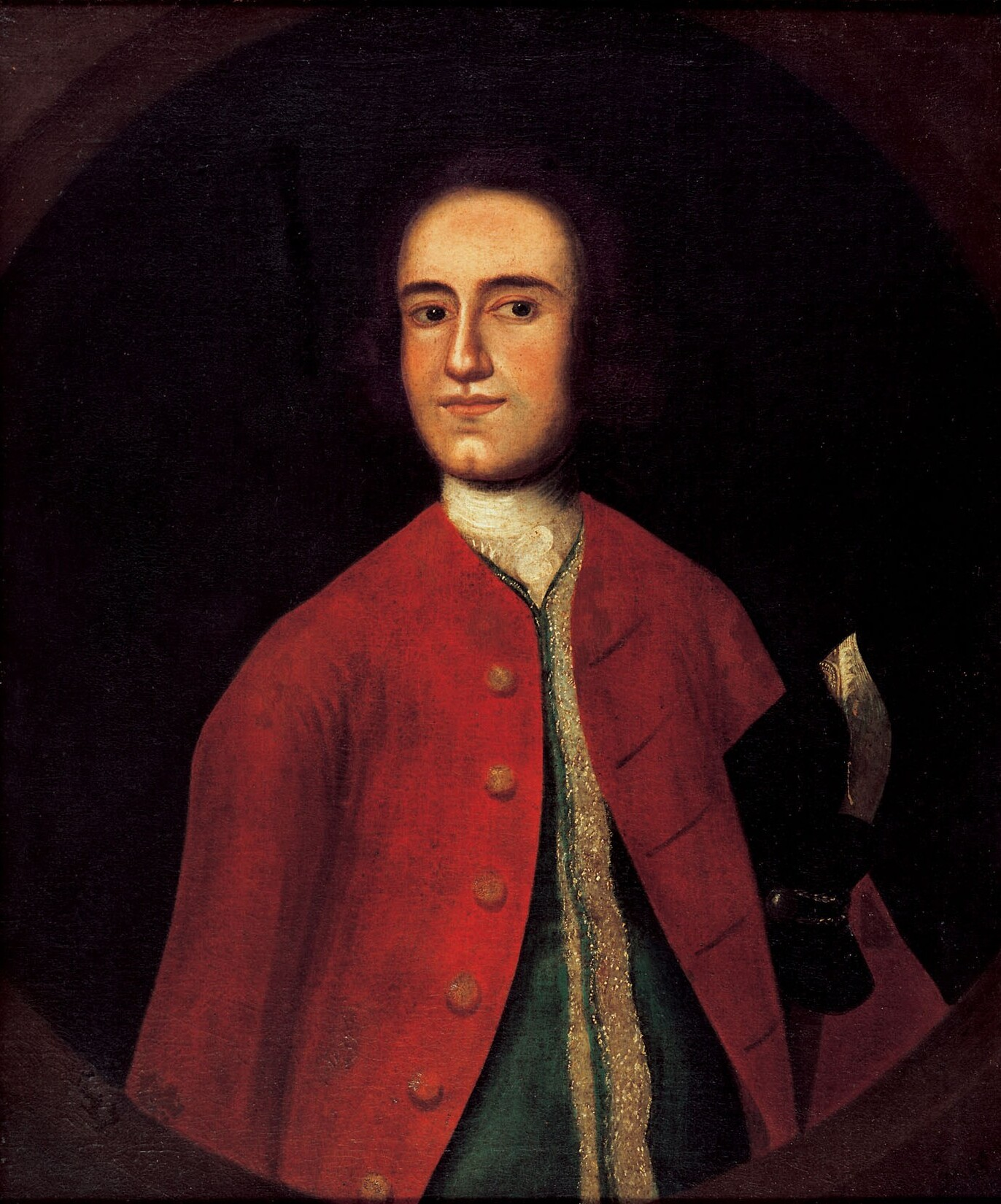
Portrait of Lawrence Washington

== Other significant works ==
- Lapowinsa, by Gustavus Hessulius, c. 1735. Oil on canvas, 33 × 25 in (83.8 × 63.5 cm). Atwater Kent Collection at Drexel (Historical Society of Pennsylvania Collection) Currently on Loan to Philadelphia Museum of Art, Philadelphia.
- Tishcohan, by Gustavus Hessulius, c. 1735. Oil on canvas, 33 × 25 in (83.8 × 63.5 cm). Atwater Kent Collection at Drexel (Historical Society of Pennsylvania Collection) Currently on Loan to Philadelphia Museum of Art, Philadelphia.
- Thomas Bordley, by Gustavus Hesselius, c. 1715. Oil on canvas. 27 × 22 41/64 in.(68.6 × 57.5 cm). Maryland Historical Society Accession: 1891-2-1
- Mrs. Charles Carroll, the "Settler"', by Gustavus Hesselius, c. 1717–1720. Oil on canvas. 30 7/64 × 25 13/64 in. (76.5 × 64.0 cm). Maryland Historical Society Accession: 1949-64-1
- Col. Leonard Hollyday, by Gustavus Hesselius, c. 1740. Oil on canvas. 27 55/64 × 23 7/64 in. (70.8 × 58.7 cm). Maryland Historical Society, Accession: 1960-88-1

== Other sources ==
- Fleischer, Roland E (1987) Gustavus Hesselius: Face Painter to the Middle Colonies (Trenton: New Jersey State Museum) ISBN 978-0938766063

== Related reading ==
- Baker, Theodore (1992). Baker's Biographical Dictionary. Schirmer Books. ISBN 978-0-02-872415-7.
- Richard H. Saunders and Ellen G. Miles (1987) American Colonial Portraits, 1700–1776 (Washington, D.C.: National Portrait Gallery, Smithsonian Institution) ISBN 9780874746952
- Pleasants, J. Hall (1945) Two Hundred and Fifty Years of Painting in Maryland (Baltimore, Maryland: Baltimore Museum of Art)
- Lindsey, Jack L., Worldly Goods, The Arts of Early Pennsylvania, 1680–1758 (Philadelphia, PA: Philadelphia Museum of Art, 1999) ISBN 978-0876331293
- Benson, Adolph B. and Naboth Hedin (1938) Swedes in America, 1638-1938 (Yale University Press) ISBN 978-0-8383-0326-9
