= Walking Purchase =

1737 agreement between the Penn family and the Lenape Native Americans

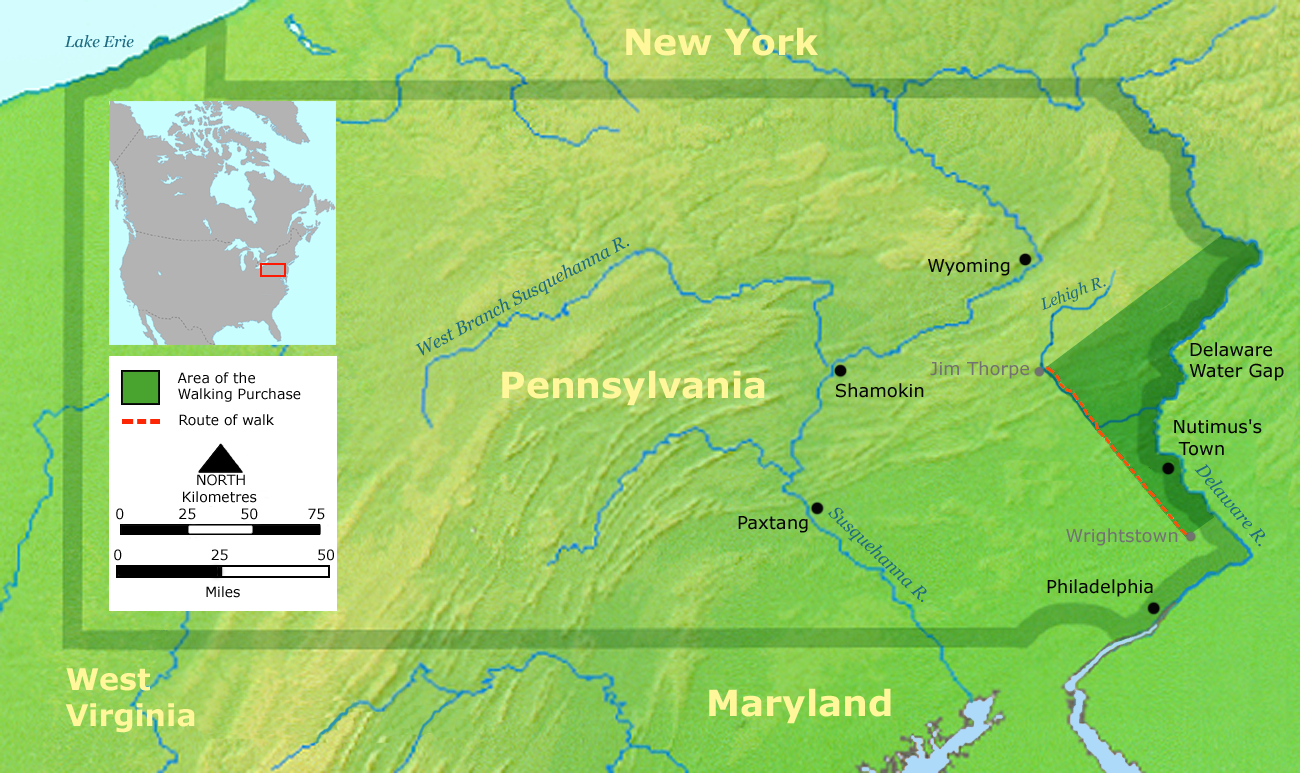
Under the Walking Treaty of 1737 during the colonial era, the sons of Province of Pennsylvania founder William Penn acquired the shaded area of present-day Lehigh Valley and Northeastern Pennsylvania and the West Jersey region in colonial New Jersey

The Walking Purchase, also known as the Walking Treaty, was a 1737 agreement between the family of William Penn, the original proprietor of the Province of Pennsylvania, and the Lenape. In the purchase, the Penn family and proprietors produced a deed to claim that a 1686 treaty with the Lenape ceded an area of 1,200,000 acres (4,860 km^{2}) in present-day Lehigh Valley and Northeastern Pennsylvania in colonial Pennsylvania, which included a western land boundary extending as far west as a man could walk in a day and a half - its namesake.

The area is along the northern reaches of the Delaware River, on Pennsylvania's border with what was called, at the time, West Jersey. Encyclopædia Britannica refers to the treaty as a "land swindle". The Lenape appealed to the Haudenosaunee to their north for aid on the issue, but the Haudenosaunee refused their request, ultimately siding with the Penn interests.

Nearly 300 years later, in 2004, a lawsuit was filed over the continuing dispute. In the case, Delaware Nation v. Pennsylvania, the Delaware Tribe, one of three later federally-recognized Lenape tribes, and its descendants in the 21st century claimed 314 acres (1.27 km^{2}) of land included in the original purchase in 1737, but the U.S. District Court granted the Commonwealth's motion to dismiss. It ruled that the case was nonjusticiable, even if the Delaware Nation's allegations of fraud were factually accurate. This ruling was upheld through several appeals in the United States courts of appeals, which culminated in the U.S. Supreme Court refusing to hear the case, thereby upholding the lower courts' decision.

== History ==
=== 17th century ===
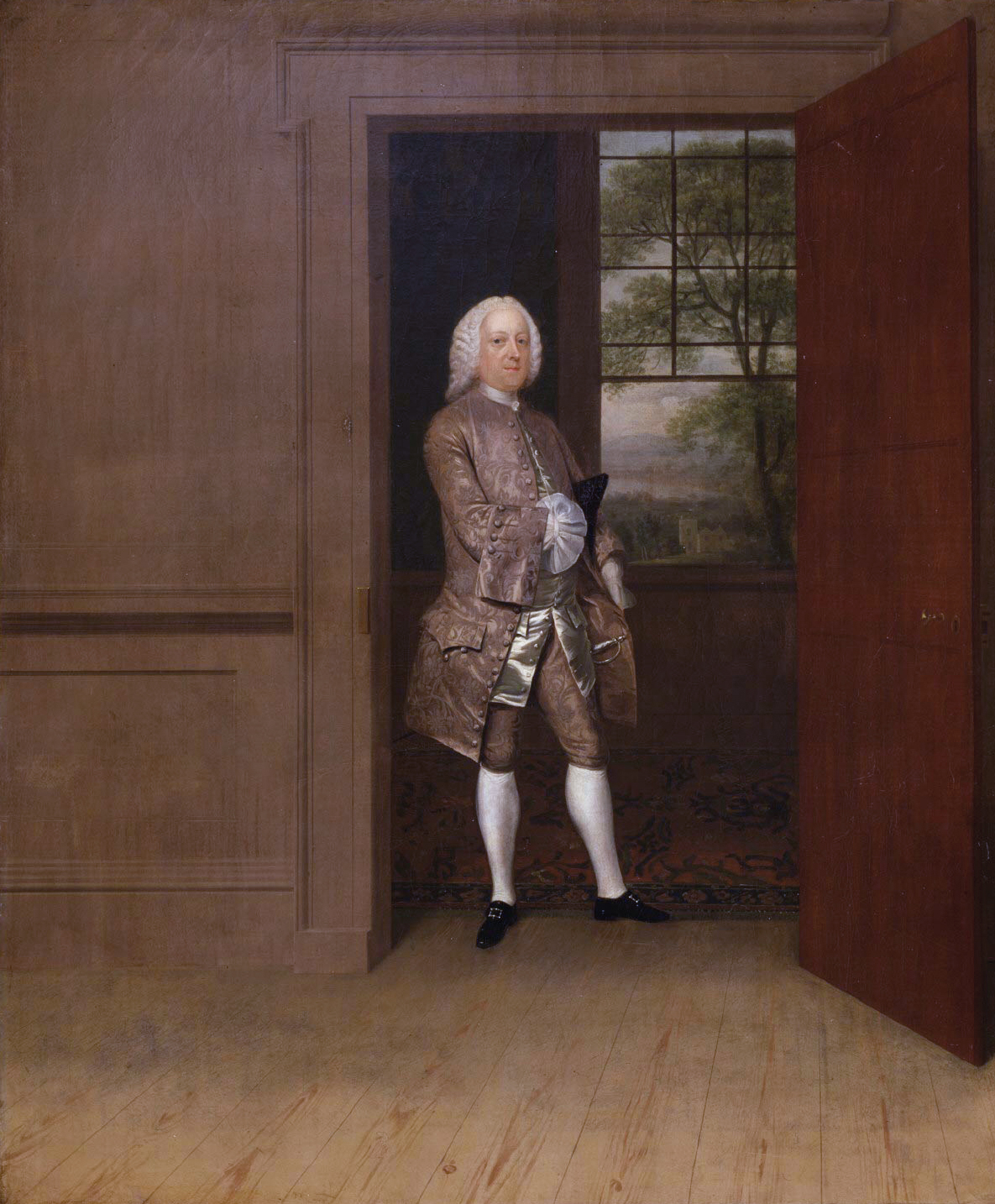
Thomas Penn, governor of the Province of Pennsylvania from 1746 to 1775, c. 1752

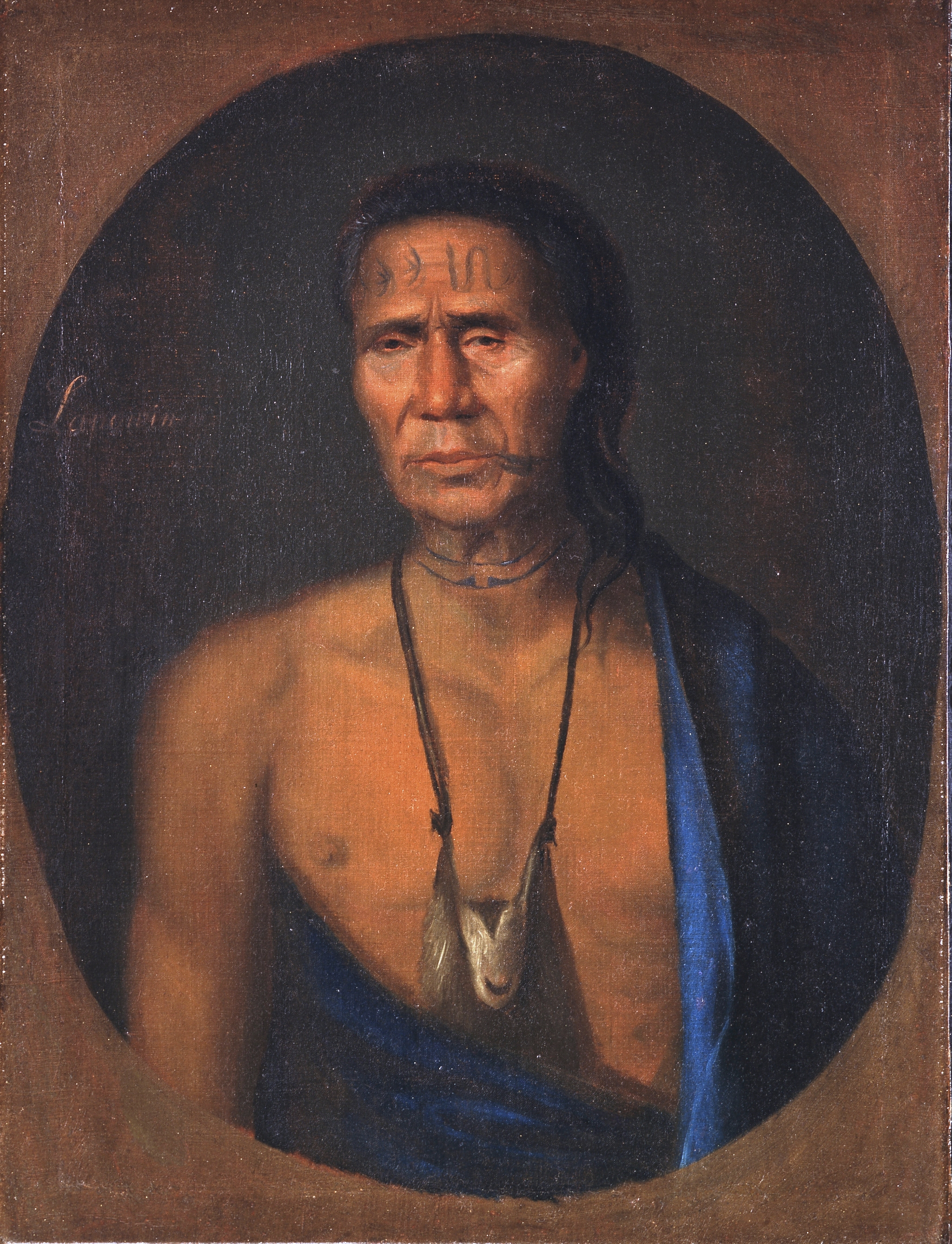
Lappawinsoe, who sold regions of present-day eastern Pennsylvania and western New Jersey to the sons of William Penn in the Walking Purchase, c. 1735

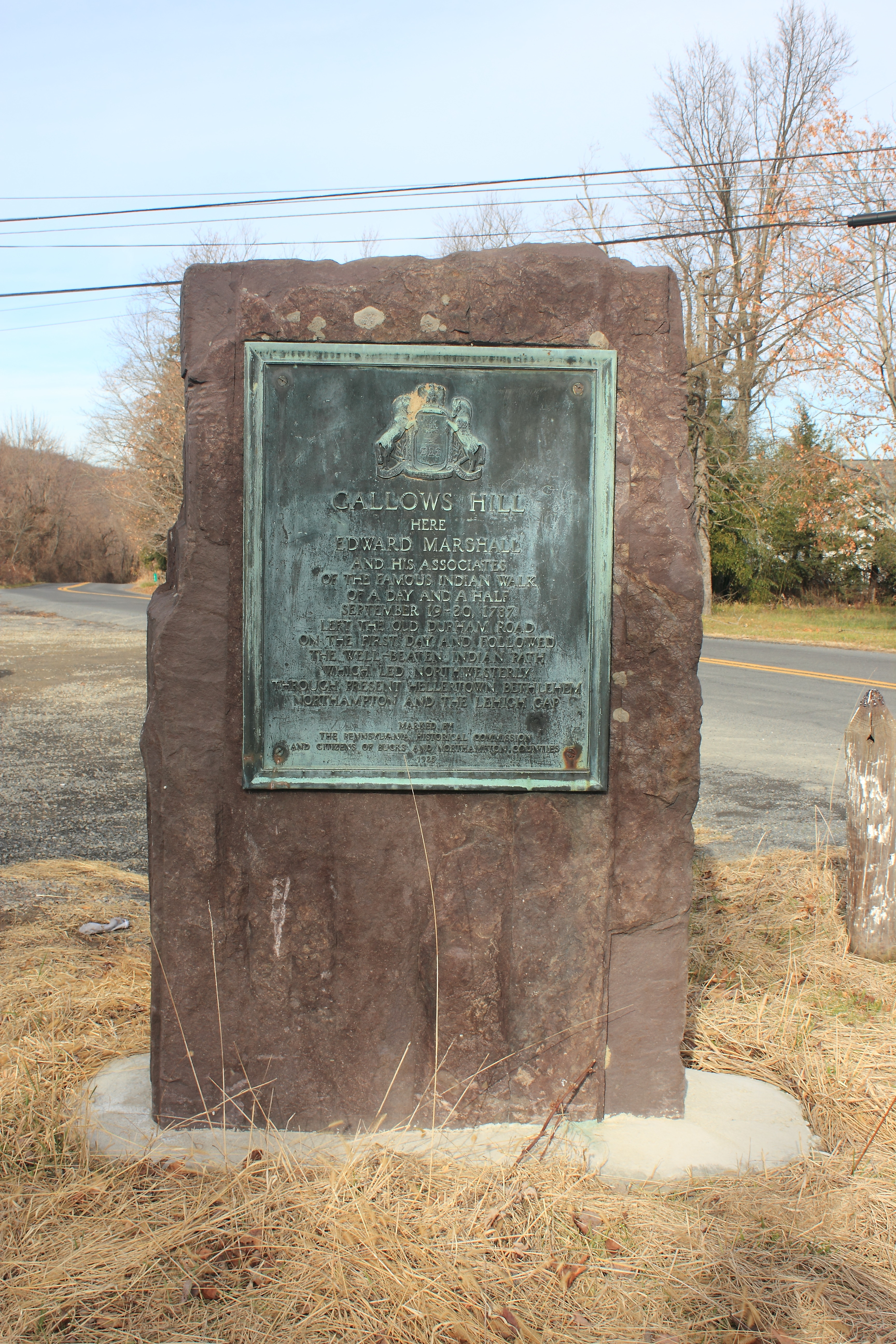
A historical marker in Nockamixon Township, erected in 1949 by the Pennsylvania Historical and Museum Commission commemorating the Walking Purchase

In 1681, the founder of the Province of Pennsylvania, William Penn, enjoyed a reputation for fair dealing with the Lenape. However, William Penn's two sons, John and Thomas, largely abandoned their father's moderate practices.

=== 18th century ===
In 1736, they claimed a deed from 1686 under which the Lenape promised to sell a tract that extended from a point on the Delaware River near present-day Wrightstown, northwest into the interior "as far as a Man could walk in a day and half," a typical Indian measurement of space. The agreement later became known as the "Walking Purchase" or the Walking Treaty of 1737.

The original 17th century document might have been a verbal agreement, an unsigned treaty, an unratified treaty, or an outright forgery. The Penns' agents, however, began selling land in the region in and around present-day Lehigh Valley along the Lehigh River prior to the Lenape vacating the still inhabited area.

To address the Lenape's misgivings and suspicions, Penn Land Office Agent and provincial secretary James Logan produced a map that misrepresented the farther Lehigh River as the closer Tohickon Creek, and including a dotted line showing a seemingly reasonable path that the walkers would take. Satisfied that the land in question was not so terrible a price to honor the old deed, the Lenape signed on, making the now 1737 treaty official.

According to the popular account, Lenape leaders assumed that about 40 miles (60 km) was the longest distance that could be covered under these conditions. Provincial Secretary Logan hired the three fastest runners in the colony, Edward Marshall, Solomon Jennings, and James Yeates, to run on a prepared trail. They were supervised during the walk by Timothy Smith, then sheriff of Bucks County, Pennsylvania.

The walk occurred on September 19, 1737; only Marshall finished, reaching the modern vicinity of present-day Jim Thorpe, Pennsylvania, 70 miles (113 km) to the north. At the end of the walk, Sheriff Smith drew a perpendicular line back toward the northeast, and claimed all the land east of these two lines ending at the Delaware River that now represents the border between eastern Pennsylvania and western New Jersey.

This resulted in an area of 1,200,932 acres (4,860 km^{2}), only slightly smaller than the size of Rhode Island, located in seven present-day counties in eastern Pennsylvania: Pike, Monroe, Carbon, Schuylkill, Northampton, Lehigh, and Bucks.

The Delaware leaders appealed for assistance to the Haudenosaunee Confederacy to the north, who claimed hegemony over the Delaware River region, but the Haudenosaunee leaders decided that it was not in their best interest to intervene on behalf of their southern neighbors since Haudenosaunee leader Captain Logan already made a deal with the Haudenosaunee to support the colonial side. As a result, the Lenape vacated the Walking Purchase lands in present-day eastern Pennsylvania and western New Jersey.

Lenape chiefs Lappawinsoe, Manawkyhickon, Sassoonan, Nenatcheehunt, and others continued protesting the arrangement, since the Lenape were forced into Shamokin and Wyoming River valleys, which were already crowded with other displaced tribes. Some Lenape later moved further west into the Ohio Country in present-day Western Pennsylvania and Ohio, and to southern and western regions in colonial New France in present-day Quebec. Because of the Walking Purchase, the Lenape grew to distrust the Pennsylvania government, and later brought suit in federal court.

== Delaware Nation v. Pennsylvania ==
=== Eastern District federal court (2004) ===
In 2004, Delaware Nation, representing the Lenape, filed suit against the Commonwealth of Pennsylvania in the U.S. District Court for the Eastern District of Pennsylvania in Philadelphia, seeking 314 acres (1.27 km^{2}) included in the 1737 Walking Purchase and patented in 1741, which was known as Tatamy's Place. The court granted the Commonwealth's motion to dismiss. According to the federal Eastern District Court's opinion:

Penn's government and practices apparently differed sharply from the Puritan-led governments of the other American colonies. The most striking difference was Penn's ability to cultivate a positive relationship based on mutual respect with the Native Americans inhabiting the province. While the Puritans "stole from the Indians ... Penn achieved peaceful relations with the Indians."

The District Court recounted the Delaware Nation's allegations:

Penn's sons were less interested than their father in cultivating a friendship with the Lenape. Thomas Penn, in particular, is reportedly responsible for executing The Walking Purchase of 1737, pursuant to which Thomas Penn approached the Lenape chiefs and "falsely represented an old, incomplete, unsigned draft of a deed as a legal contract." ( Compl. ¶ 38.) Thomas Penn represented to the Lenape chiefs that some fifty years prior, the ancestors of the Lenape had signed documents stating that the "land to be deeded to the Penns was as much as could be covered in a day-and-a-half's walk." ( Id.) Believing that their forefathers had made such an agreement, the Lenape Chiefs agreed to the terms of the deed and consented to the day-and-a-half walk.

The Lenape chiefs trusted that the "white men" would take a leisurely walk through the tangled Pennsylvanian forests along the Delaware River. The Lenape chiefs were not aware that they were about to lose a significant amount of land. Unbeknownst to the Lenape, Thomas Penn took measures to ensure that the distance covered by his "walkers" would be as large as possible. Among other things, Thomas Penn had a straight path cleared through the forests and hired three of the fastest runners in the province. "[H]e and his agents spent weeks mapping their route-which went northwest rather than north as the treaty specified-hacking trails out of the woods." ( Id. ¶ 39.) In addition, Thomas Penn promised that the fastest runner would receive five pounds sterling (equal to £971.46 today) and 500 acres (200 ha) of land. In the end, the runners of the Walking Purchase of 1737 procured 1,200 square miles [more than 1 million acres] of Lenni Lenape land in Pennsylvania. Included in the land procured was land commonly referred to as the "Forks of the Delaware," which contained the parcel of land at the center of this dispute, "Tatamy's Place."

The Lenape complained to the King of England about the execution of the "walk" by Penn and his agents to no avail. In response, the Lenape began their movement westward in compliance with their ancestors' purported agreement to the terms of the Walking Purchase's deed. Over a hundred years later, experts examining the deed concluded it likely was a forgery. As a result of the Walking Purchase, members of the Lenape, now recognized as The Delaware Nation, were segregated into pockets or parcels of land surrounded by non-tribal settlers.

The Delaware Tribe conceded that Thomas Penn had "sovereign authority," but challenged the transaction on the ground that it was fraudulent. The court held that the justness of the extinguishment of aboriginal title is nonjusticiable, including in the case of fraud. Because the extinguishment occurred prior to the passage of the first Indian Nonintercourse Act in 1790, that Act did not avail the Delaware.

=== Federal appellate courts (2006) ===
In 2006, Delaware Nation's appeal of the decision was heard in the United States Court of Appeals for the Third Circuit in Philadelphia, which upheld the earlier ruling of the District Court. The Third Circuit upheld that aboriginal title may validly be extinguished by fraud, and further held that the tribe had waived the issue of whether Penn was actually a sovereign purchaser. Moreover, the Circuit held that any grants to the tribe subsequent to the extinguishment could not re-establish aboriginal title. Therefore, the Circuit did not consider the merits of the tribe's argument that:

The Delaware Nation claims in its appeal that the King of England—not Thomas Penn—was the sovereign over the territory that included Tatamy's Place. Therefore, Thomas Penn could not extinguish aboriginal title via the Walking Purchase and, consequently, the Delaware Nation maintains a right of occupancy and use.

The Circuit Court found it insufficient that the complaint alleged that Penn was "accountable directly to the King of England."

Delaware Nation filed for the case to be heard by the U.S. Supreme Court, which declined to hear the case on appeal, upholding the prior rulings by the two federal courts in Philadelphia.

== See also ==
- Pennamite-Yankee Wars
- Phelps and Gorham Purchase
