= Thomas Penn =

English landowner and mercer (1702–1775)

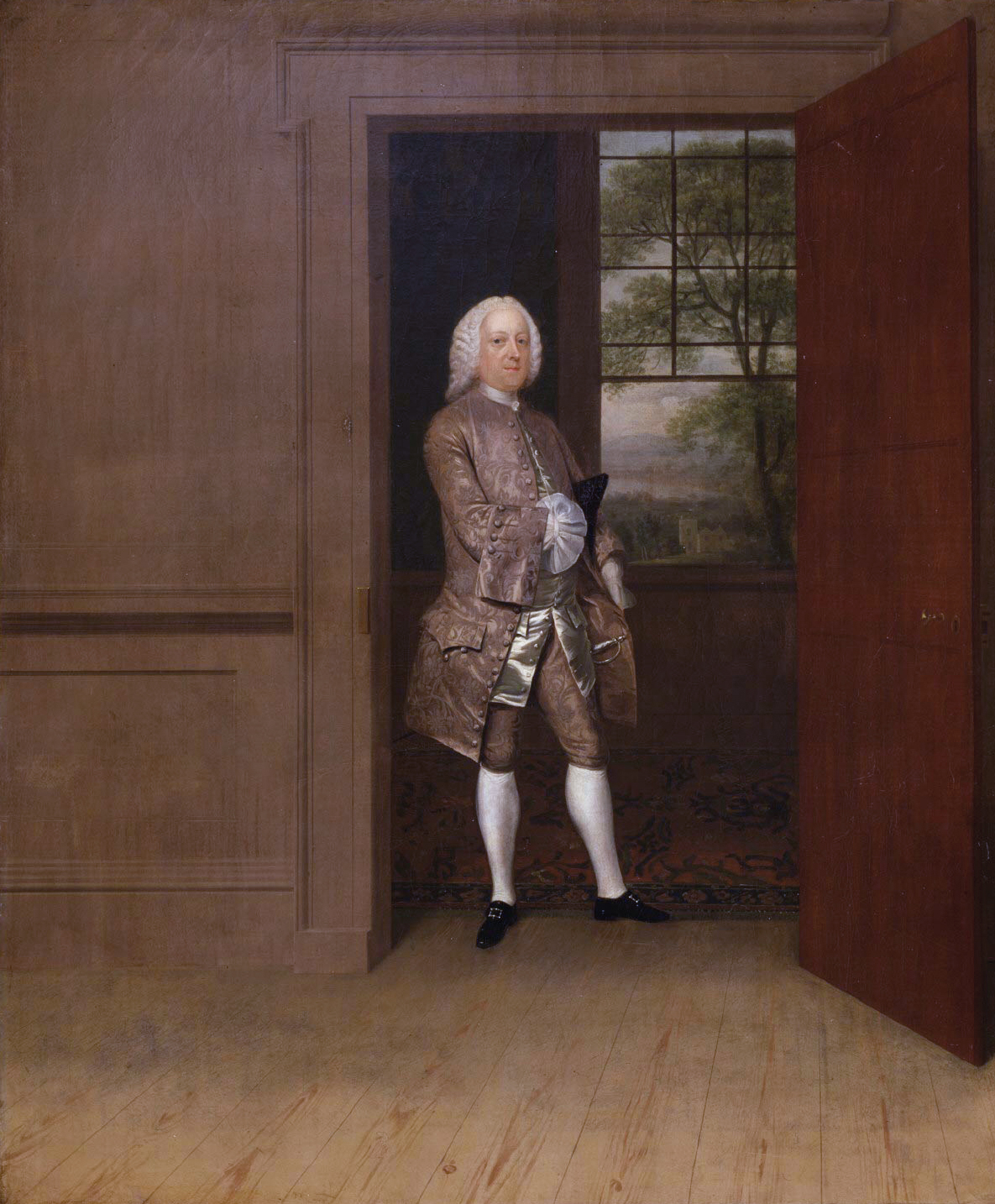
- A 1752 portrait of Thomas Penn

Chief proprietor of Pennsylvania
- In office 1746–1775
- Monarchs: George II (1746–1760); George III (1760–1775)
- Preceded by: John Penn
- Succeeded by: John Penn

Personal details
- Born: 19 March 1702 [O.S. 8 March 1702] Kensington, London, Kingdom of Great Britain
- Died: 21 March 1775 (aged 73) Stoke Poges, Buckinghamshire, Kingdom of Great Britain
- Spouse: Lady Juliana Fermor Penn (m. 1751)
- Children: 8, including Granville
- Parent(s): William Penn; Hannah Callowhill Penn
- Profession: Landowner, mercer

Thomas Penn (19 March 1702 [O.S. 8 March 1702] – 21 March 1775) (Note: The birth date for Penn is 8 March 1702 under the Julian calendar; the equivalent Gregorian calendar date is 19 March 1702. The Gregorian calendar went into effect 14 September 1752 in Great Britain and its colonies and all dates in this article except his birthday are Julian before that date. 1 January is treated as the beginning of the year in this article even though 25 March was treated as the beginning of the year in many British contexts before 1753.) was an English landowner and mercer who was the chief proprietor of Pennsylvania from 1746 to 1775. He was one of 17 children of William Penn, the founder of the colonial-era Province of Pennsylvania in British America. In 1737, Thomas Penn negotiated the Walking Purchase, a contested land cession treaty with the Lenape that transferred control over 1,200,000 acres (4,860 km^{2}) of territory in the present-day Lehigh Valley and Northeastern Pennsylvania regions of Pennsylvania and a portion of West Jersey in colonial New Jersey from the Lenape tribe to the province of Pennsylvania.

Born in 1702 in Kensington, England into a Quaker family, Penn was apprenticed to a London mercer at a young age by his father William due to his family's financial insecurity. When his father died in 1718, William's last will and testament gave his proprietorship of Pennsylvania to his three sons, including Penn. In 1732, Penn travelled to the colony to assume control over his family's interests in Pennsylvania, including collecting unpaid rents.

As his family back in England were deeply in debt, Penn abandoned his father's conciliatory approach towards Indian tribes residing on the colonial frontier in order to acquire more land to sell. In addition to signing treaties with Indian leaders, Penn strengthened the power of the deputy governor and frequently used his prerogative to overturn legislation from the Pennsylvania General Assembly, acts which made him unpopular in the colony.

Penn returned to England in 1741, though he continued to exert control over affairs in Pennsylvania. When his brother John died in 1746, his will and testament passed control over John's share of the family proprietorship to Penn, making his the chief proprietor of Pennsylvania. In 1751, he married Lady Juliana Fermor, who he went on to have seven children with. Penn eventually died at his country estate of Stoke Park, Buckinghamshire in 1775.

== Early life ==
Thomas Penn was born on 8 March 1702 (O.S.) in the Kensington section of London. His father was William Penn, a Quaker religious thinker, writer, and colonizer, who established the Province of Pennsylvania, one of the original Thirteen Colonies, in 1681, after receiving a charter from Charles II. Penn's mother was Hannah Callowhill Penn, who married her husband on 5 March 1696. The couple lived in Pennsylvania from 1682 to 1701 in the Pennsbury Manor area of present-day Bucks County, Pennsylvania, prior to returning to England.

Despite William being the proprietor of Pennsylvania, the Penn family only derived a small amount of income from the colony. In order to provide his family with alternative sources of financial security, Penn was apprenticed to a London mercer who was part of the Worshipful Company of Mercers by his father when he was growing up. When William died in 1718, his will gave control of the proprietorship to Penn and brothers John and Richard.

In 1727, William's will, which was disputed by the children of his first wife Gulielma, was upheld in the British legal system; four years later, Gulielma's children agreed to settle the case in exchange for a sum of money. The terms of the proprietorship issued by Charles II stipulated that the Penn family would be given absolute ownership over all lands and mining rights in the new colony in return for delivering two beaver skins from Pennsylvania annually to Windsor Castle, though "the proprietorship was still no guarantee of wealth."

== Career ==
=== Management of Pennsylvania ===
In 1732, Penn, who had by this point taken control over managing his family's financial affairs, travelled to the Province of Pennsylvania, the first member of his family to do so since William had left the colony in 1701. After arriving in Pennsylvania, Penn received a generally warm reception from the colonists living there. His interests in the colony included collecting rents owed to the Penn family from local colonists, securing payments for territory which had already been colonised by settlers and securing the Pennsylvania frontier from potential attacks by Indians tribes and nearby French colonies.

Penn's brothers John and Richard, who had remained in England when Penn travelled to Pennsylvania, wrote a letter to him in May 1734 stressing that the family was now 8,000 pounds in debt and were in urgent need of revenues from the colony. In the letter, the pair insisted upon the "absolute necessity" of finding methods to generate profits from Pennsylvania and suggested to Penn that if he was unable to generate a profit from the colony, it might be preferable to sell off the proprietorship as the family was "now at the Mercy of our creditors without anything to Maintain us".

In response to these demands, Penn abandoned the previously conciliatory approach to negotiations with Indian tribes established by his father and adopted a more aggressive approach aimed at securing more land for colonial settlement. Working together with the royal governor of Pennsylvania, James Logan, Penn made plans to acquire more land from the Lenape. Such efforts were spurred by increased immigration to the colony and fears that settlers from the nearby Province of New York was infringing on Pennsylvania's northern borders in the Upper Delaware river valley.

Together with Logan, Penn negotiated the Walking Purchase treaty with Lenape chief Lappawinsoe in 1737. The treaty stipulated that a 1686 treaty signed between William Penn and the Lenape gave 1,200,000 acres (4,860 km^{2}) of land along the northern reaches of the Delaware River to Pennsylvania; the Lenape subsequently evacuated their settlements from the transferred territory. During the treaty negotiations, Logan gave the Lenape an inaccurate map, and according to historian Steven Grant Harper, the treaty was the product of duplicity on the part of Penn and Logan.

Penn also took a leading role in the colony's domestic affairs. Though Penn was technically governor of the colony, a deputy governor had been installed to manage the affairs of Pennsylvania on a permanent basis, and he took several steps to increase the executive power held by the deputy governor (which strengthened the influence his family held within Pennsylvania). In 1741, Penn returned to England, leaving control over the colony in the hands of deputy George Thomas; his reputation in the colony had worsened to the point where he was thought of as "greedy and cold".

=== Return to England ===
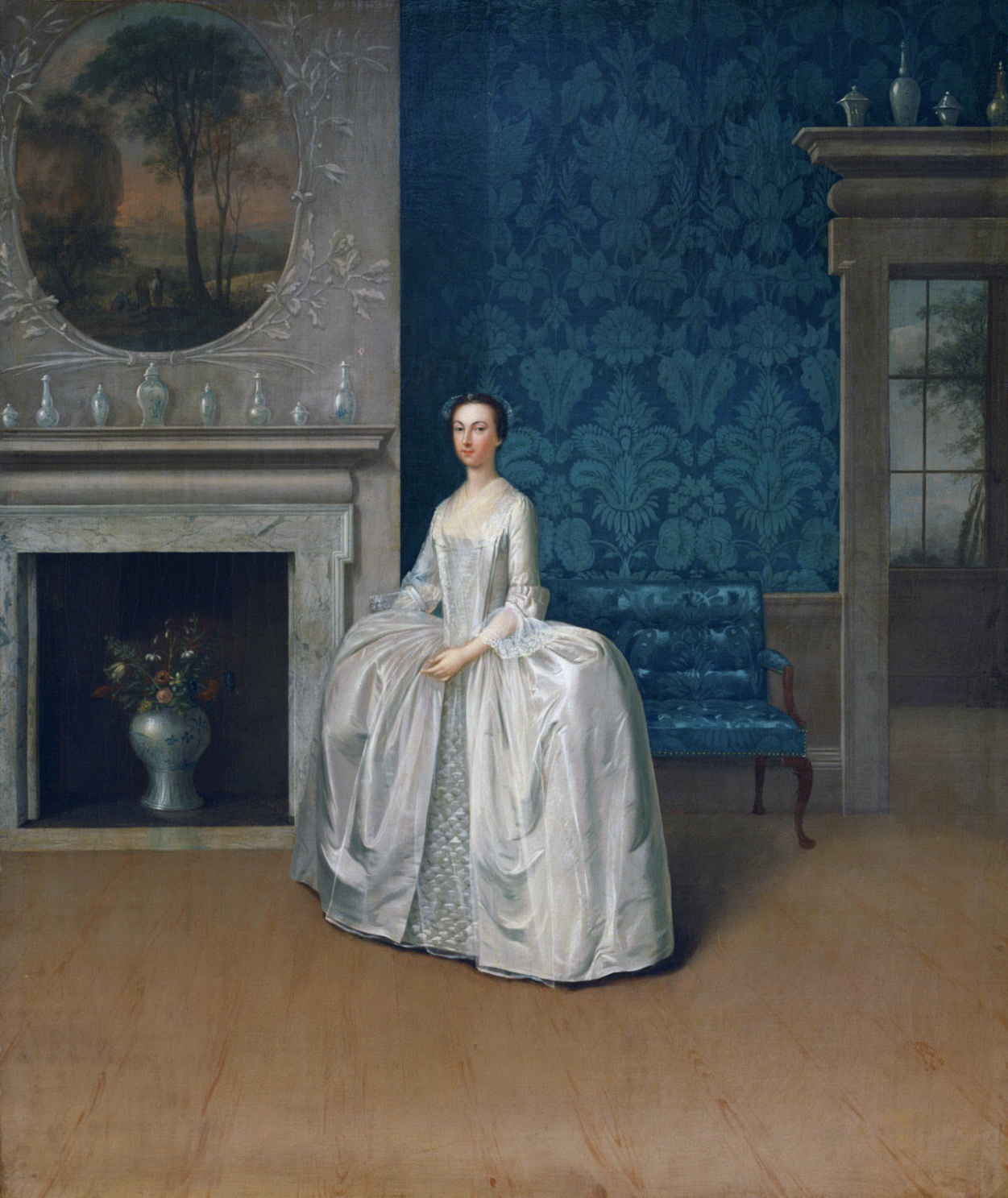
A 1751 portrait of Lady Juliana Fermor, Thomas Penn's wife, by Arthur Devis

After Penn returned to England, John died in 1746. In his will and testament, John deeded his portion of the proprietorship, amounting to 50%, to Penn, leading to him becoming the chief proprietor of Pennsylvania. Penn continued to involve himself in Pennsylvania's affairs, including an attempt to make the Lenape conform to a European-style land tenure by designating a portion of the lands near the Lehigh River as an "Indian Manor" to be inhabited solely by the tribe.

In 1755, the Lenape tribals residing in the "Indian Manor" migrated westwards in response to the turmoil of the ongoing French and Indian War and increasing tensions with European colonists on the Pennsylvania frontier. After Penn received news of this from an employee of the Penn family in Pennsylvania named Richard Peters, he instructed Peters to open the territory to prospective colonists "as there is no probability of the Indians coming back to the Indian Manor".

Postmaster Benjamin Franklin was dispatched by the Pennsylvania General Assembly to England as a colonial agent in 1757 with orders to protest the Penn family's political influence in the colony to the British government. Though Penn maintained a close eye on Franklin's movements, he remained unconcerned about the potential revocation of his proprietorship; as Penn noted, Franklin had few allies in the British government and his mission soon ended in failure.

The Seven Years' War, which lasted from 1754 to 1763, "revealed the difficulties of managing the family's substantial American interests from England" and in 1763 John, Penn's nephew, was appointed as the deputy governor of Pennsylvania. John continued to maintain frequent correspondence with Penn regarding issues in Pennsylvania, and gradually took on more responsibilities in managing the affairs of the colony by himself as Penn's health gradually deteriorated.

== Personal life ==
On 22 August 1751, Penn married Lady Juliana Fermor, the daughter of Thomas Fermor, 1st Earl of Pomfret; the 22-year old Juliana was 27 years younger than her spouse. One year after their marriage, Penn commissioned painter Arthur Devis to paint portraits of both himself and his wife. As noted by English historian Charlotte Fell-Smith, though he was born into a Quaker family, Penn gradually abandoned several aspects of the faith over the course of his life, and his disassociation from the Quaker faith was confirmed by marrying Juliana in a Church of England church.

Penn and Juliana had seven children over the course of their marriage: four sons and three daughters. His sons included John, who served as the High Sheriff of Buckinghamshire in 1798 and sat in the British House of Commons as a member of parliament for Helston from 1802 to 1805, and Granville, who was a writer and scriptural geologist who was elected to the American Philosophical Society in 1836. John also greatly expanded Stoke Park, Buckinghamshire, an English country house which Penn had bought in 1760, with designs from architect James Wyatt.

== Death ==
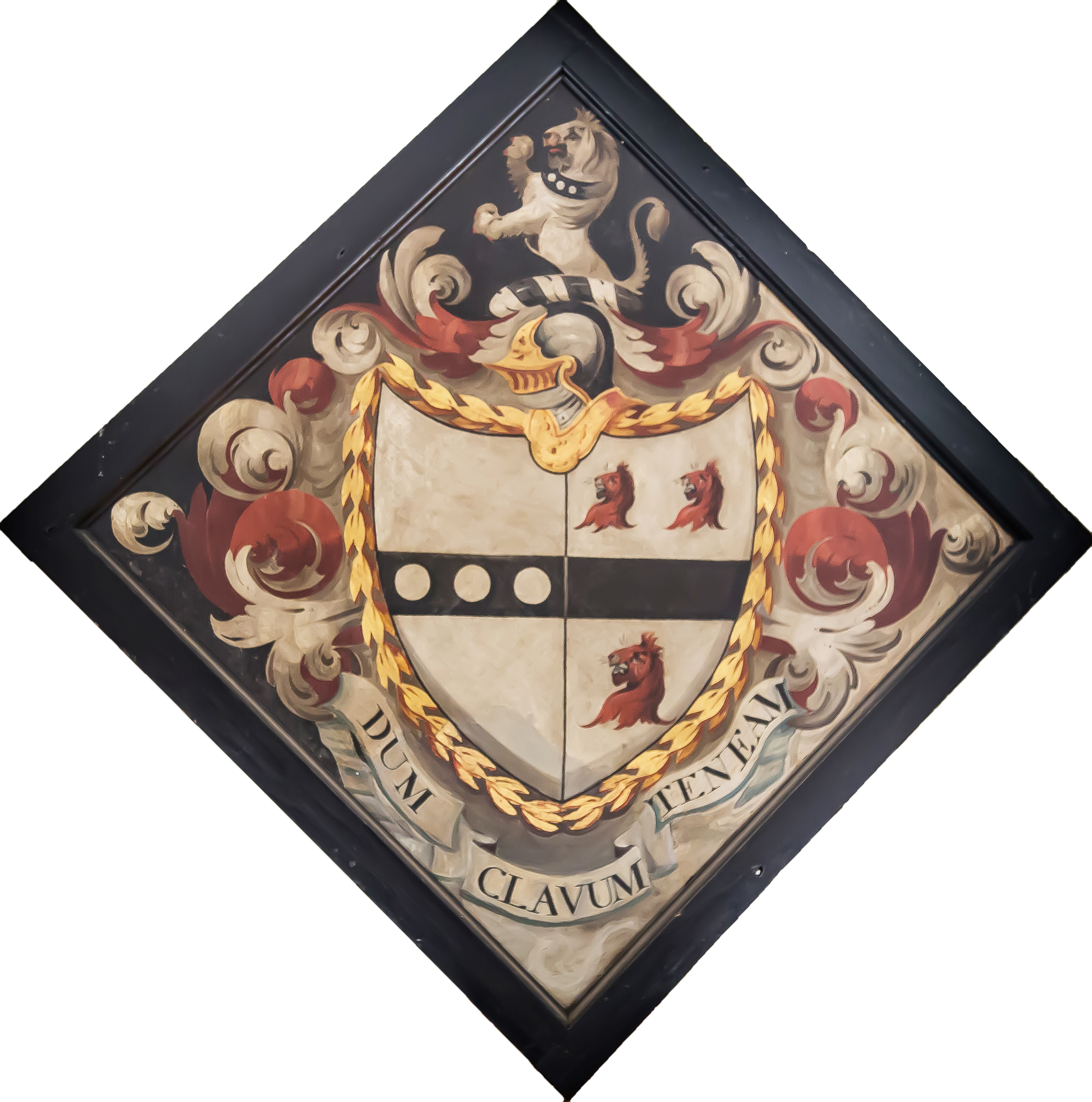
Funeral hatchment in Church of St Giles, Stoke Poges

On 21 March 1775, Penn died at his personal residence in Stoke Poges, Buckinghamshire. In his will and testament, Penn left his share of the Pennsylvania proprietorship to his son John, who proved to be the last member of the family to hold the proprietorship as it was formally dissolved by the government of Pennsylvania after the American War of Independence broke out in 1775. As compensation for approximately 24 million acres (97,124 km^{2}) and £118,569 in rent owed, the Pennsylvanian government gave the Penn family £130,000.

In Pennsylvania, Penn's legacy among the residents of the region, in contrast to views of his father, was marked by resentment and contempt; writing in 1757, Franklin wrote that Penn's refusal to pay taxes to Pennsylvania led him to "[conceive] at that moment a more cordial and thorough Contempt [towards] him than I ever before felt for any Man living". In addition to his refusal to pay taxes, Penn frequently used his prerogative to overturn the General Assembly's legislation, which some historians have claimed influenced Pennsylvania's support for the American Revolution.

== Legacy ==
In the early 21st century, Penn's involvement in the Walking Purchase later became a source of contention among the Lenape. In 2004, the Delaware Tribe of Western Oklahoma filed a lawsuit against the Commonwealth of Pennsylvania in the United States District Court for the Eastern District of Pennsylvania. The Delaware Tribe sought 314 acres (1.27 km^{2}) of land included in the Walking Purchase, claiming that the transaction between Penn and the Lenape was fraudulent. The court granted Pennsylvania's motion to dismiss, a decision which was upheld by the Third Circuit Court of Appeals in 2006.
