= Haverford College Arboretum =

Arboretum in Haverford, Pennsylvania, United States

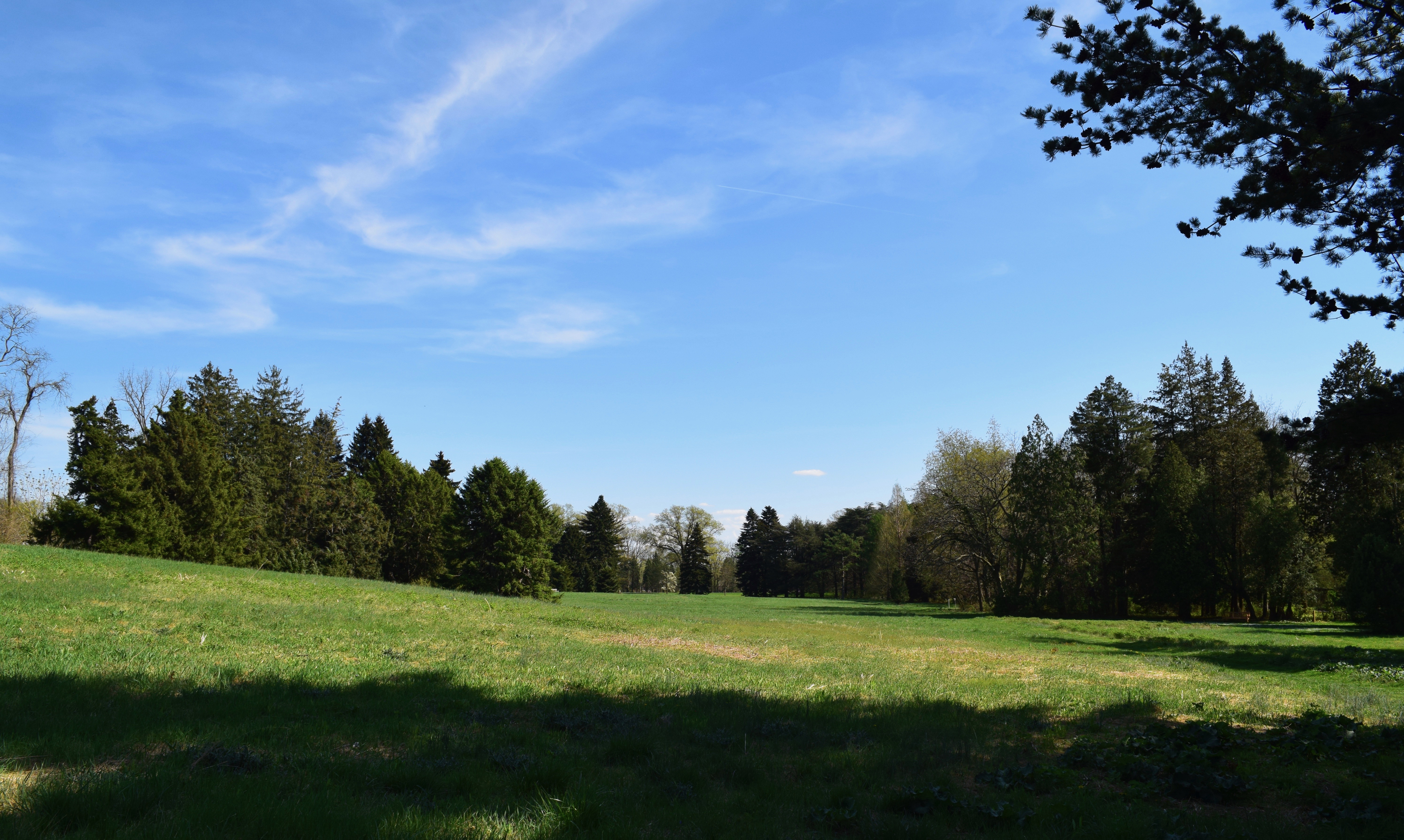
- View of the Ryan Pinetum and meadows.
- Interactive map of Haverford College Arboretum
- Type: Arboretum and public garden
- Location: 370 Lancaster Avenue, Haverford, PA 19041 USA
- Coordinates: 40.01162°N 75.29895°W
- Area: (216 acres (87 ha))
- Founder: William Carvill
- Owner: Haverford College
- Website: www.haverford.edu/arboretum

The Haverford College Arboretum is a (216 acres (87 ha)) arboretum comprising the entire campus of Haverford College, in Haverford, Pennsylvania. It is open daily, dawn to dusk, without charge.

As of 2006, the arboretum contains mature oaks and maples, specimen trees, flowering trees, and natural woodland areas. Over 1,500 trees are labeled with their scientific name, common name and nativity. Specific points of interest include:

- Ryan Pinetum - Over 300 mature conifers, labeled and arranged by family groupings.
- State champion trees - Loblolly Pine, Pinus taeda; and Hinoki False Cypress, Chamaecyparis obtusa.
- Penn Treaty Elm - a descendant of the American elm under which William Penn signed his treaty with Native Americans; planted 1915. In 2010, a descendant of Haverford's Elm was planted in Penn Treaty Park, the site of the 1683 treaty.
- Asian gardens - the Denis Asian Garden and Teaf Memorial Zen-style Garden.
- 2.2-mile Nature Trail - A public, wooded recreation trail following the perimeter of campus, popular with runners and dog walkers

== History ==
The arboretum's origins stretch back to 1831, when the campus property was purchased by a group of Welsh Quakers. The College itself was founded two years later.

In 1834, English gardener William Carvill laid out the campus in the English landscape tradition championed by noted landscape architect Sir Humphry Repton.

In 1901, shortly after the discovery of Carvill's original landscape drawings, students and alumni seeking to preserve Haverford's natural beauty formed the Campus Club.

In 1928 the College minutes record that "a comprehensive planting of trees" was discussed, and in response the Superintendent of Grounds began a scientific collection of trees arranged in generic and family groupings.

The Haverford College Arboretum Association was founded in 1974 and continues to oversee the preservation of historic landscapes and trees; the implementation of sustainable plantings and practices; and the development of educational community programming.

== Gallery ==
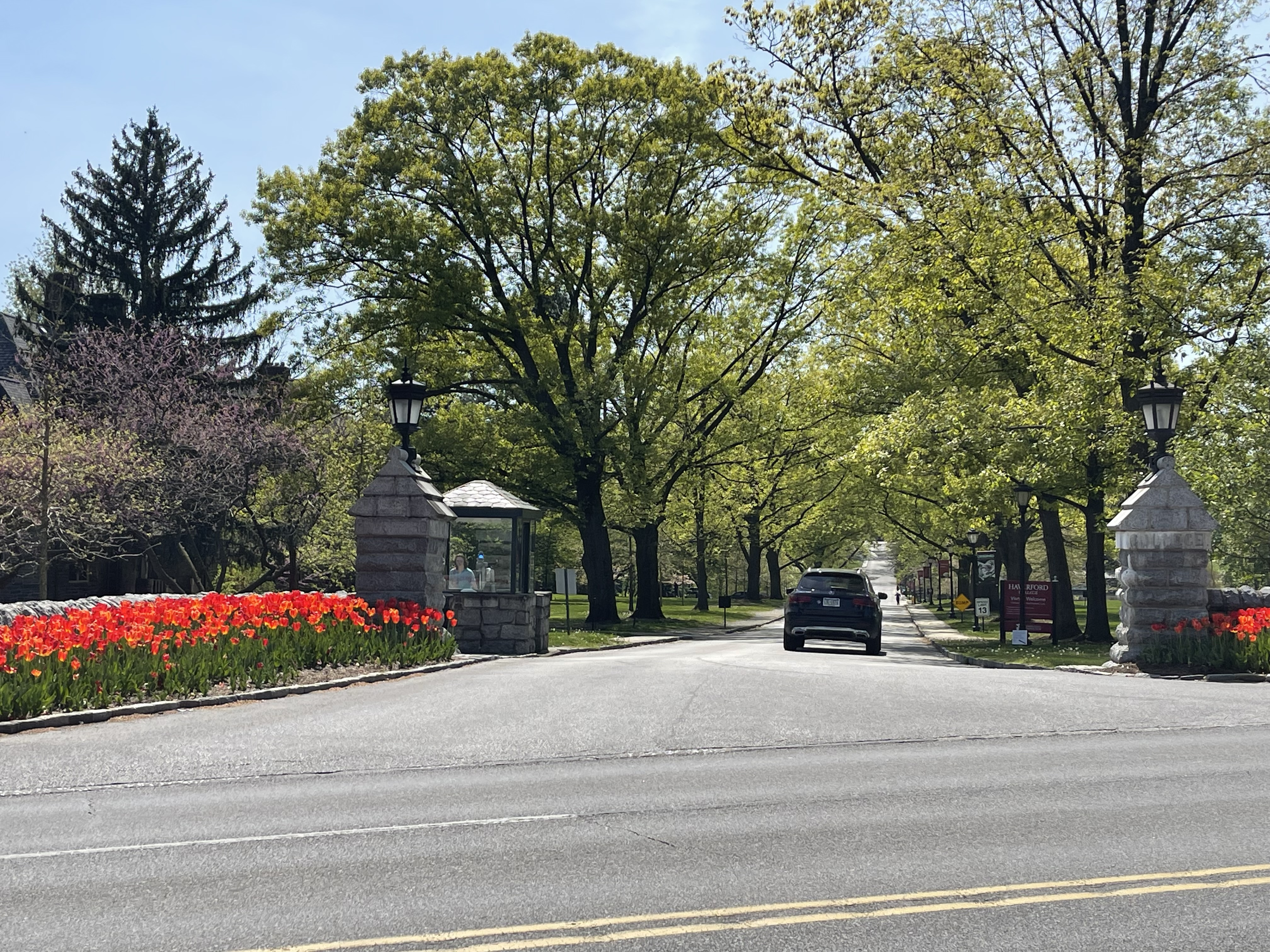
Tree-lined entrance.

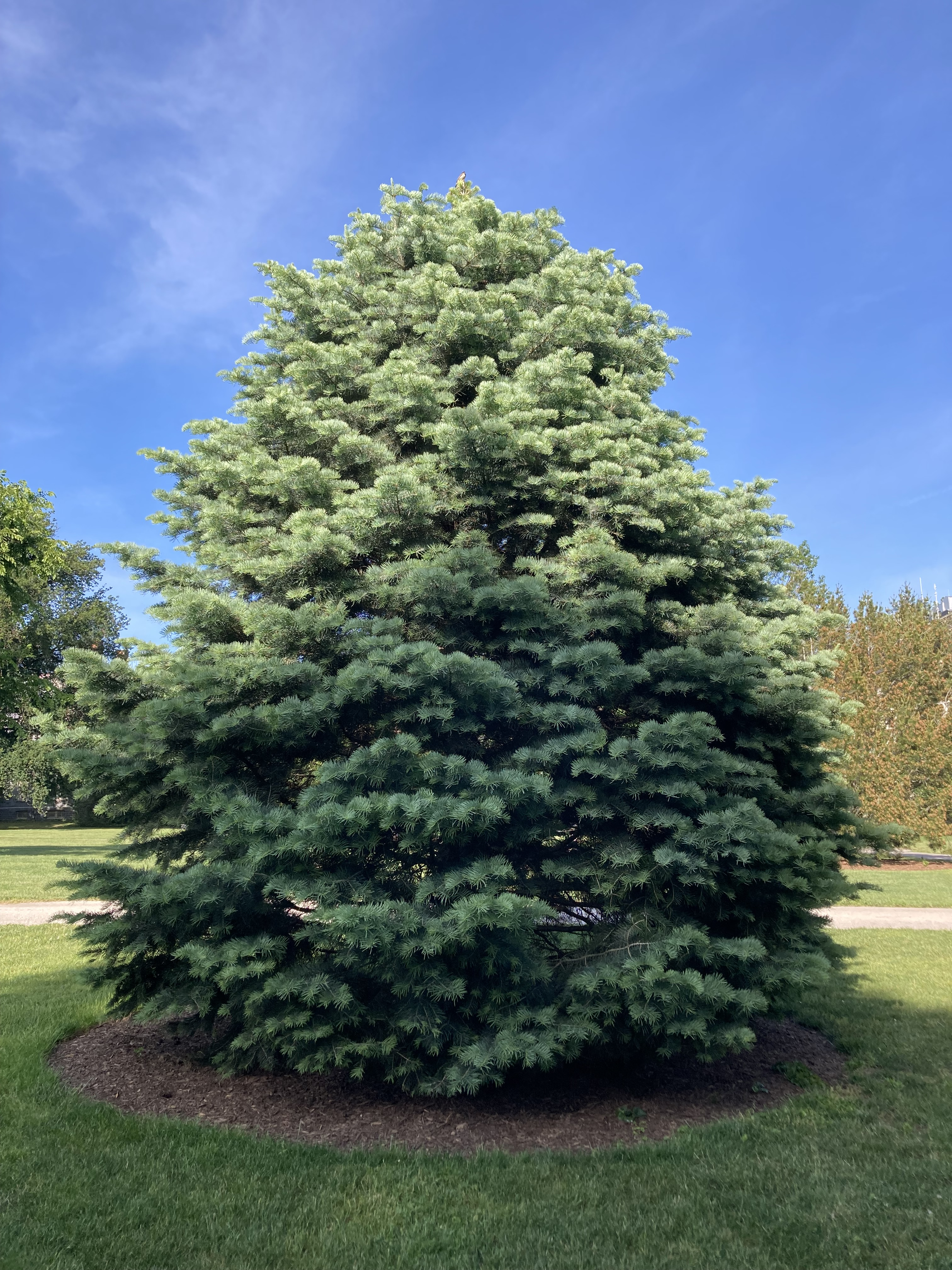
Abies concolor at Founders Green.

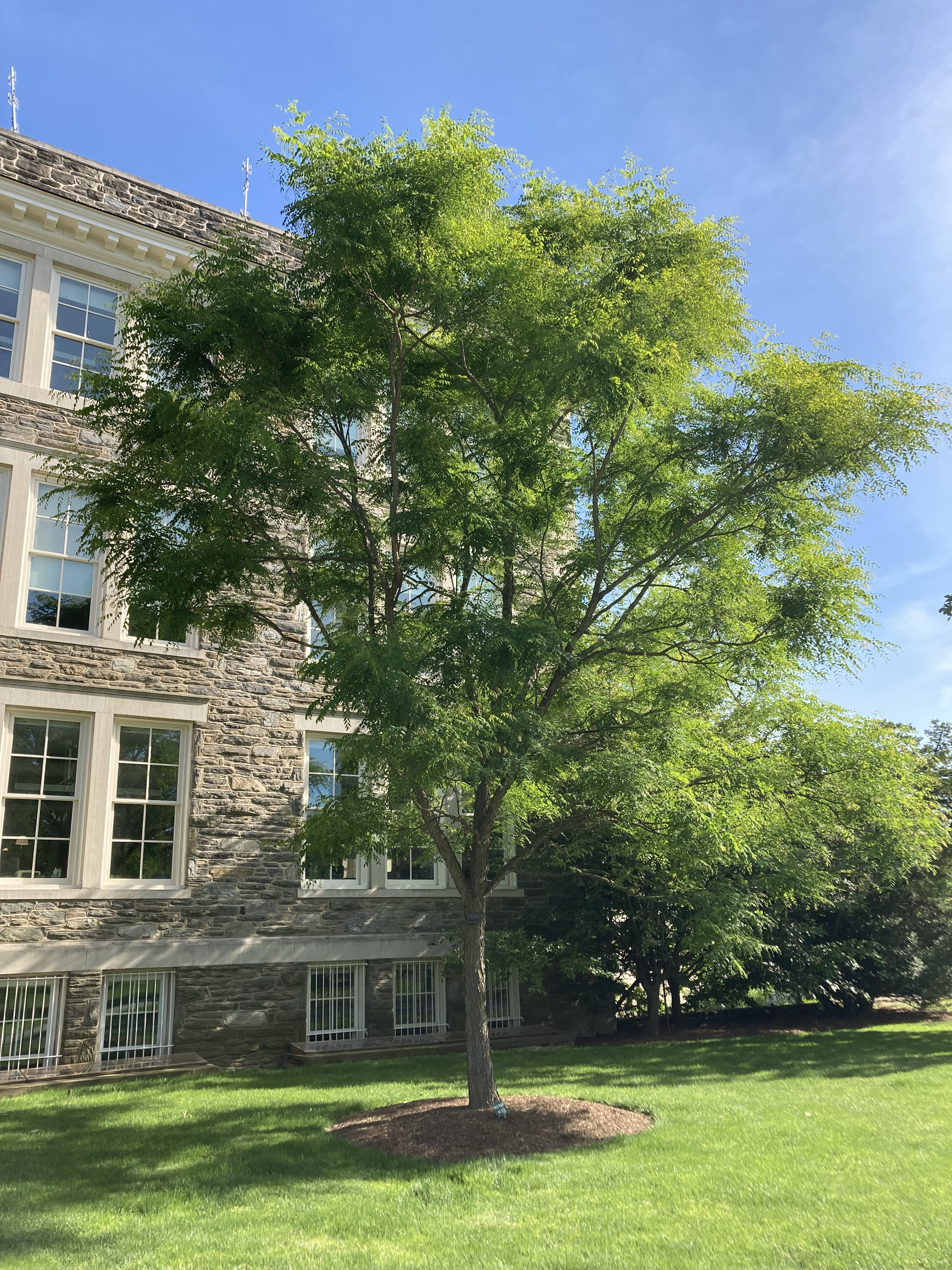
Kentucky coffeetree.

Penn Treaty Elm

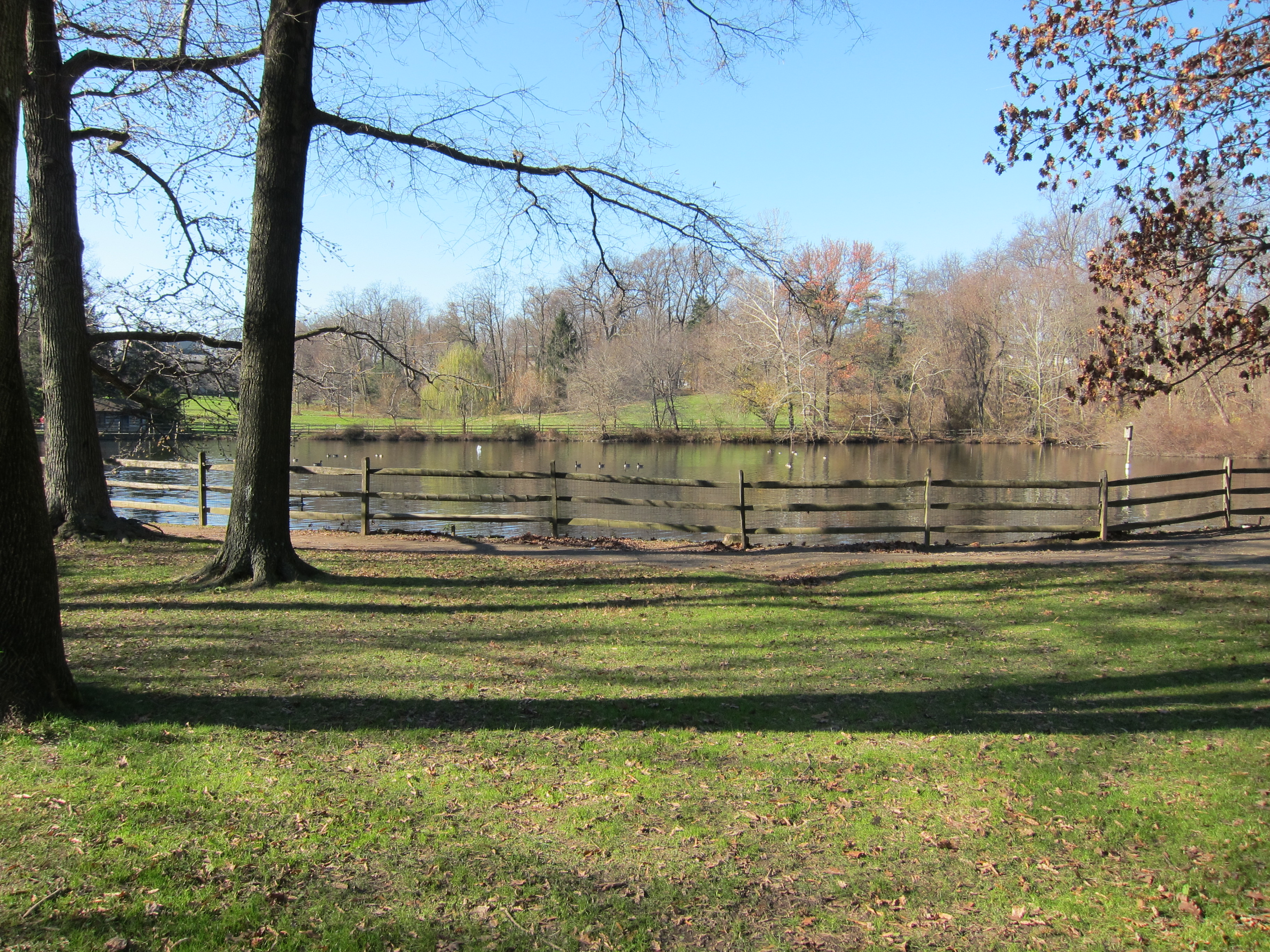
The Duck Pond.

The Duck Pond through three seasons

== See also ==
- List of botanical gardens in the United States
- ArbNet
