= Penn Treaty Park =

Park in Philadelphia

Coordinates: 39.966°N 75.129°W

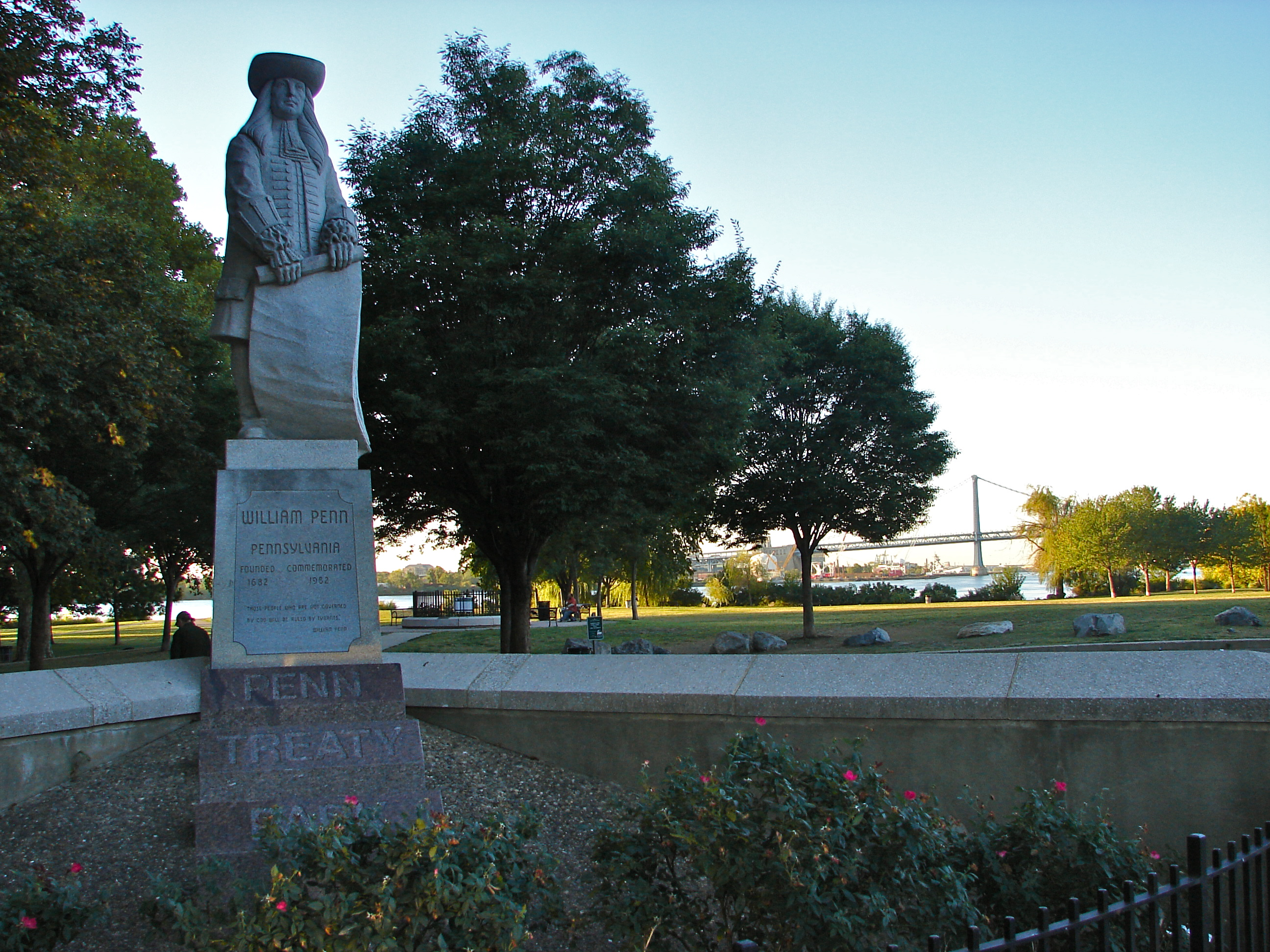
Penn Treaty Park with a statue of William Penn to the left and the Benjamin Franklin Bridge in the distance

Penn Treaty Park is a small park on the western bank of the Delaware River, in the Fishtown neighborhood of Philadelphia, Pennsylvania. It is located on Beach Street, near its intersection with Delaware Avenue.

The land that is now the park was part of the Lenape village of Shackamaxon, where William Penn famously entered into a treaty of peace with Tamanend, a chief of the Lenape Turtle Clan in 1683.

== Description ==
The southern part of the park consists of a walkway surrounding an open green favored by dog walkers and lunchtime picnickers. A stand of mature trees shades the northern part of the park. A statue of William Penn by sculptor Frank Gaylord stands near the northern entrance to the park.

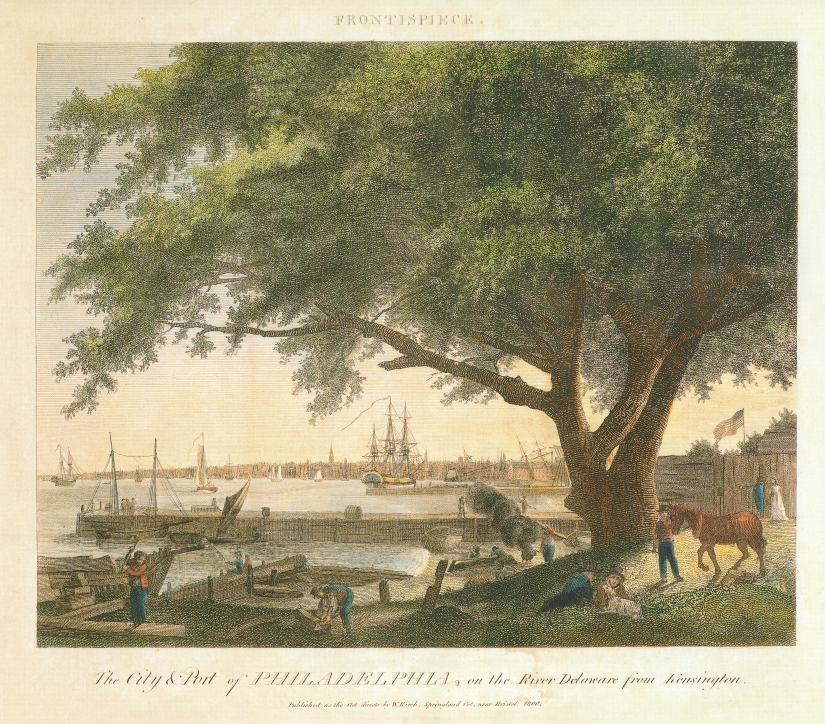
The "Treaty Elm," Birch's Views of Philadelphia (1800).

At the river's edge, the park provides an unimpeded view of the full span of the Benjamin Franklin Bridge that connects Philadelphia to the city of Camden, New Jersey. Directly to the north is a power-generating station owned and operated by the Philadelphia Electric Company (PECO). Bordering the southern edge of the park there was a nightclub with part of its facilities built on a reclaimed pier that stretches out into the river, however this is gone and will soon become a condominium development. An iron and concrete fishing pier used to extend out into the river, but it was seriously damaged by an out-of-control barge, fenced off for a while and then eventually done away with.

Though now located in a post-industrial area surrounded by the remnants of heavy industry, the park has been an open space with public access to the river since its dedication on October 28, 1893.

== History ==
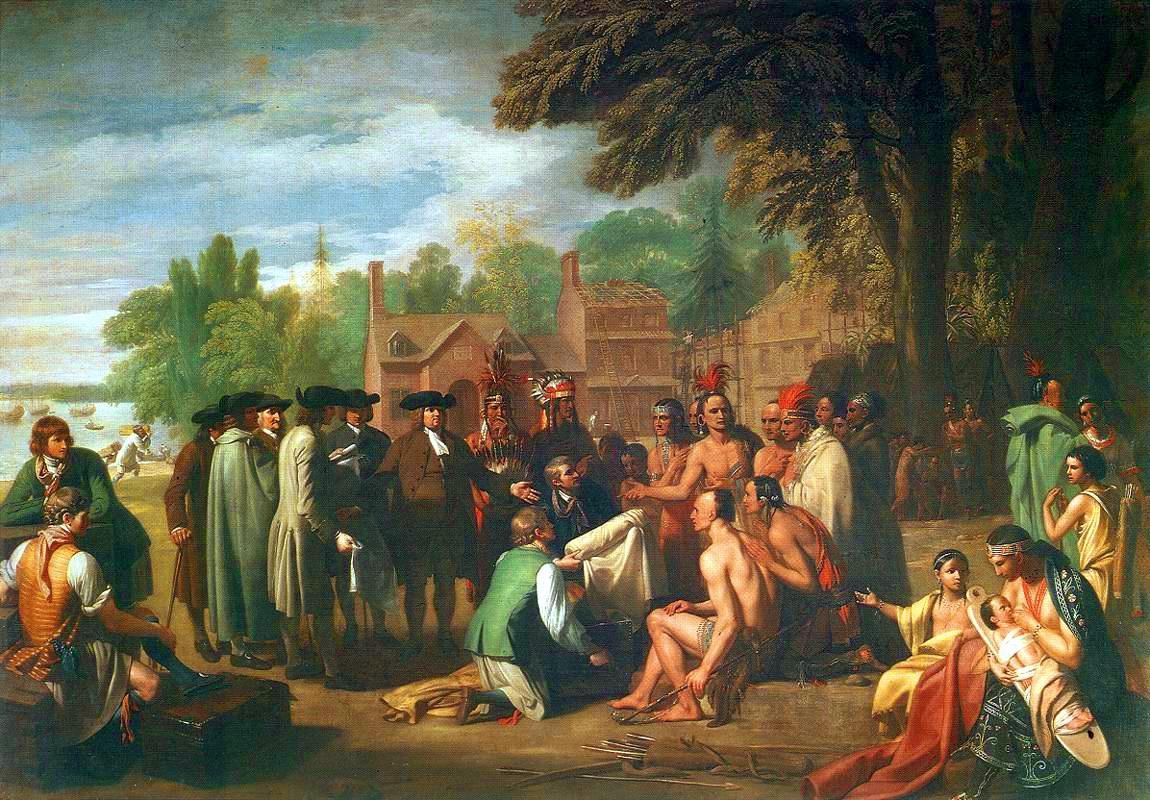
Penn's Treaty with the Indians (1771-72) by Benjamin West, Pennsylvania Academy of the Fine Arts.

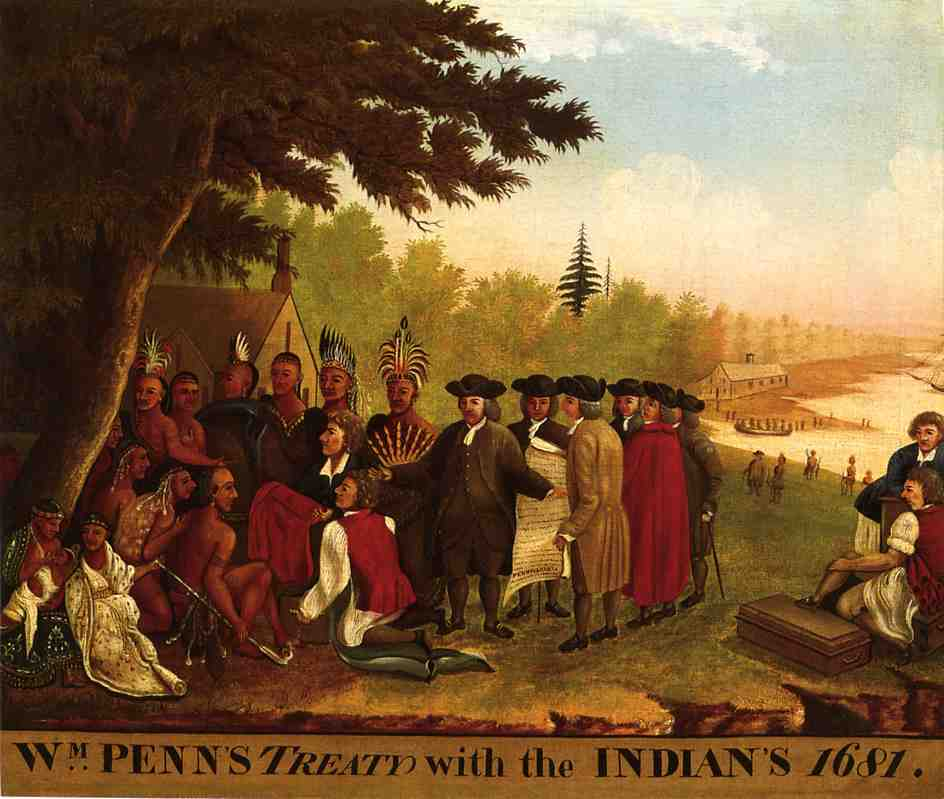
"Penn's Treaty with the Indians" by Edward Hicks, 1837. Hicks also included the subject in many of the 61 versions of his "Peaceable Kingdom."

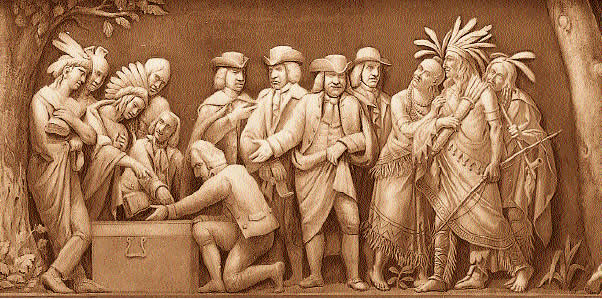
"Penn and the Indians" (1879) by Constantino Brumidi, Rotunda of the U.S. Capitol.

In the year 1683, the land that is now the park was part of the Lenape village of Shackamaxon. Under an elm tree immortalized in a painting by Benjamin West, William Penn famously entered into a treaty of peace with a chief of the Lenape Turtle Clan named Tamanend (later referred to by the Dutch as Tammany or Saint Tammany).

Penn, unarmed in accord with Quaker custom and speaking the Algonquian language, proclaimed that, "We meet on the broad pathway of good faith and good-will; no advantage shall be taken on either side, but all shall be openness and love. We are the same as if one man’s body was to be divided into two parts; we are of one flesh and one blood." Tamanend replied, "We will live in love with William Penn and his children as long as the creeks and rivers run, and while the sun, moon, and stars endure."

This peace between the Lenape Turtle Clan and Penn's successors would endure almost a century, until the Penn's Creek Massacre of 1755. It was remarked upon by Voltaire, who called it "... the only treaty never sworn to and never broken." This location became part of the Fairman Estate and was purchased by Captain Anthony Palmer around 1730 just before he founded the town of Kensington.

The famous elm tree under which the treaty was conducted fell during a storm in 1810. Soon thereafter, a monument was erected on the site where the elm tree was located to commemorate the treaty. The small obelisk remained tucked away in the northwest corner of a lumber yard that sat on the site, until actions were taken in 1893 to acquire the land and build the park that exists today. The park officially opened on October 28, 1893.

After the original tree fell, the Oliver and Vanduzen families took cuttings and seedlings from the tree at that time. They gave offspring of the great Elm to Pennsylvania Hospital, University of Pennsylvania and Haverford College.

On May 6, 2010 at Penn Treaty Park an Elm Tree descendant was planted again. Haverford College Arboretum donated a descendant of the Treaty Elm. The Friends of Penn Treaty Park provided the funding to transport the tree and plant the new tree. Pastor Norwood, from the Tribal Council of the Nanticoke Lenni Lenape and board member of the Penn Treaty Museum provided a blessing. Fairmount Park assisted.

== See also ==
- List of parks in Philadelphia
