= Treaty of Shackamaxon =

Treaty signed by William Penn with the Lenni Lenape in 1682

Coordinates: 39.966°N 75.129°W

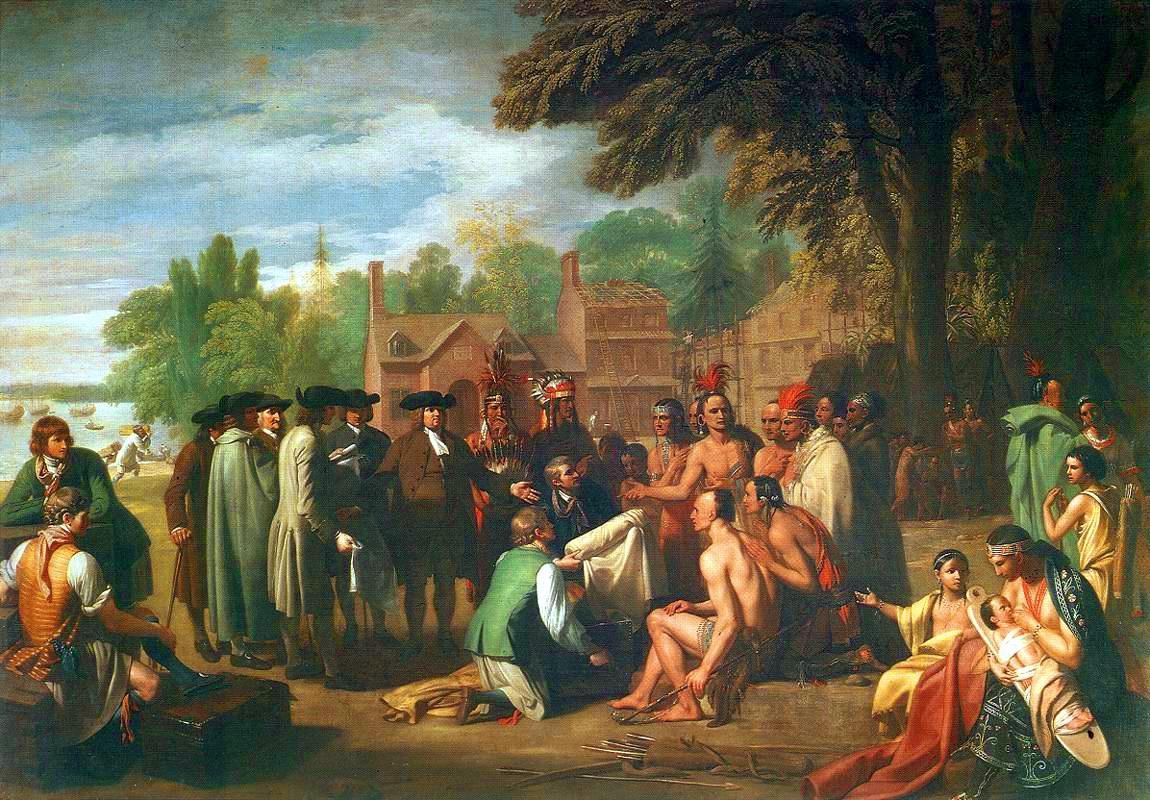
Penn's Treaty with the Indians, a 1772 portrait by Benjamin West

The Treaty of Shackamaxon, also called the Great Treaty and Penn's Treaty, was a treaty between William Penn and Tamanend of the Lenape signed in 1682. The treaty created peace between the Quakers and Lenape, with Tamanend saying the two would "live in peace as long as the waters [ran] in the rivers and creeks and as long as the stars and moon [endured]."

== Description ==
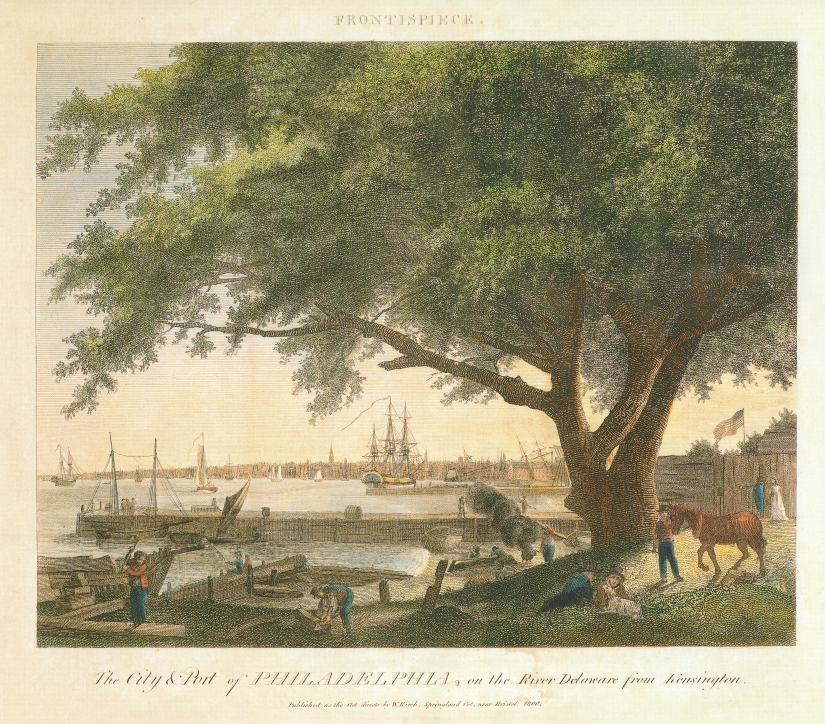
Birch's Views of Philadelphia, an 1800 portrait by William Birch

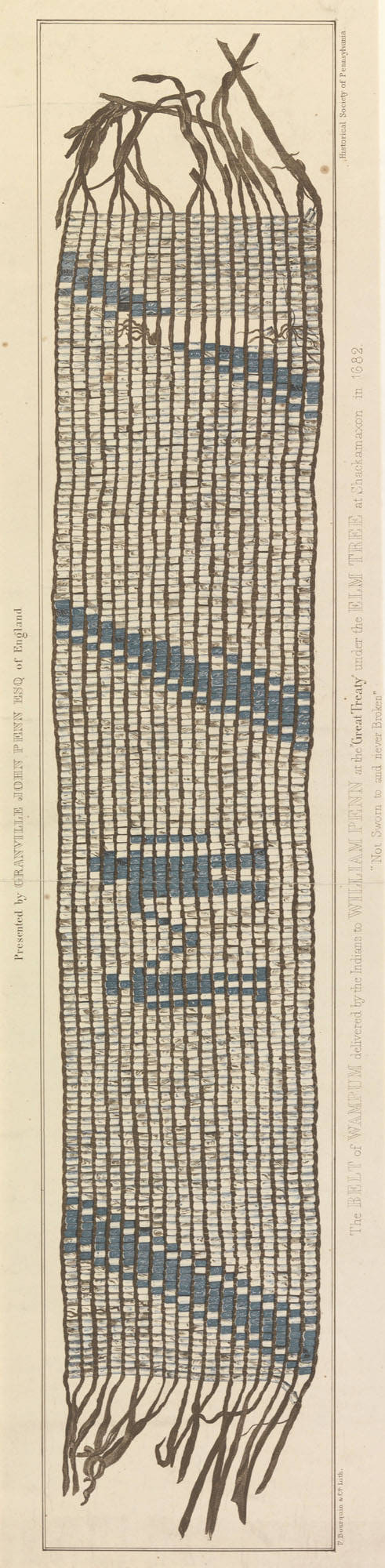
The wampum belt given to William Penn by the Indians at the "Great Treaty" under the Shackamaxon elm tree in 1682

William Penn, who had been granted a land charter by King Charles II, arrived in North America in late October 1682. According to historical tradition, he soon made a treaty with the Lenni Lenape under an ancient elm tree. Francis Jennings argues that William Penn very likely signed a treaty, but that his less scrupulous sons, William Jr., John, and Thomas, destroyed the original document. Through such means, according to Jennings, the younger Penns sought to renege on the treaty to which their father had agreed. Curators of the Philadelphia History Museum at Atwater Kent claim that a wampum belt in their possession serves as authentication that such a meeting did indeed take place; however, the wampum belt cannot prove or disprove whether the Lenni Lenape and the colony came to a formal agreement, and if so, what the provisions of such an agreement entailed.

The location traditionally associated with the treaty was a meeting place near the Delaware River used by the Lenape Native American tribe. Shackamaxon, the name European settlers used for the area, may have been derived from the Lenape term "Sakimauchheen Ing" (pronounced Sak-i-mauch-heen Ing) which means "to make a chief or king place." It was where the Lenape "crowned" their many family "sakima" (chief) or their three clan "kitakima" (big or clan chief) of the Lenape Nation. The name may have also been derived from "Schachamesink", meaning "Place of Eels."

The site lies within the present-day borders of Philadelphia, Pennsylvania. Six Swedish families were recorded as living in this area before Penn's arrival and sold their properties to the English settlers. The territory of Shackamaxon evolved into the neighborhoods of Kensington and Fishtown. There is a Shackamaxon Street that runs several blocks through Fishtown.

The event was depicted in several works of art (most notably, Benjamin West's paintings) and was mentioned by the French author Voltaire. The legendary elm tree marking the spot blew down in a storm on March 5, 1810. Its location was memorialized by the placing of an obelisk in 1827 by the Penn Society. The event was further memorialized by the founding of a park in 1893, known as Penn Treaty Park. The Pennsylvania Historical and Museum Commission refers to the Shackamaxon treaty on its website.
