= Penn (name) =

Penn is a surname and given name. It may refer to:

== Surname ==
- Abram Penn (1743–1801), landowner and Revolutionary War officer from Virginia
- Alan Penn, British academic and architectural researcher
- Alexander Penn Wooldridge (1847–1930), American mayor of Austin, Texas
- Alexander Penn (1906–1972), Israeli poet
- Arthur Penn (1922–2010), American film director and producer
- Arthur Horace Penn (1886–1960), member of the British Royal Household
- Audrey Penn, American children's author
- B.J. Penn (born 1978), American mixed martial arts fighter
- Chris Penn (1965–2006), son of Leo; actor
- Claire Penn (1951–2018), South African speech and language pathologist
- Dan Penn (born 1941), American musician
- Eric Penn (1878–1915), English cricketer
- Hannah Callowhill Penn (1671–1726), second wife of William Penn, administrator of the Province of Pennsylvania after her husband's incapacitation and death
- Harry Penn (1902?–1963), civil rights activist and African-American dentist
- Irving Penn (1917–2009), American photographer
- Jack Penn (1909–1996), South African surgeon
- John Penn (disambiguation)
- Kal Penn (born 1977), American actor and public servant
- Leo Penn (1921–1998), actor
- Maik Penn (born 1981), German politician
- Mark Penn (born 1954), American public relations CEO and campaign strategist
- Michael Penn (born 1958), son of Leo; singer-songwriter
- Osnat Penn (born 1981), Israeli computational biologist
- Robert Penn (disambiguation)
- Robin Wright (born 1966), actress; sometime known as Robin Wright Penn, former wife of Sean
- Russell Penn (born 1985), English footballer
- Springett Penn (I) (1675–1696), second son of William Penn
- Springett Penn (II) (1700 or 1701–1731), son of William Penn Jr. and a grandson and heir of William Penn
- Sean Penn (born 1960), son of Leo; actor
- Steve Penn (born 1968), American handball player
- William Penn (1644–1718), founder of Pennsylvania
- William Penn Jr., son of William Penn
- William Penn (Royal Navy officer) (1621–1670), English admiral and Member of Parliament, father of William Penn
- Zak Penn (born 1968), American screenwriter

== Given name ==
- Penn Badgley (born 1986), American actor
- Penn Jillette (born 1955), member of the comedy and magic duo Penn & Teller
- Penn Jones Jr. (1914–1998), American author and journalist
- Penn Kemp (born 1944), Canadian poet and playwright
- Penn Murfee (born 1994), American baseball pitcher
