= John Penn =

John Penn may refer to:

- Descendants of William Penn, 1st proprietor of Pennsylvania:
  - John Penn ("the American") (1700–1746), son of William Penn, 2nd proprietor of Pennsylvania, inherited 50% interest in Colony, died childless
  - John Penn (governor) (1729–1795), son of Richard Penn, Sr. and grandson of William Penn, colonial governor of Pennsylvania, his 25% interest in the Colony was lost in the American Revolution
  - John Penn (writer) (1760–1834), also called John Penn of Stoke, son of Thomas Penn and grandson of William Penn, 5th proprietor of Pennsylvania, his 75% interest in the Colony was lost in the American Revolution
- John Penn (North Carolina politician) (1741–1788), Continental Congressman from North Carolina, signer of the Declaration of Independence
- John Penn (engineer) (1805–1878), British marine engine engineer
- John Penn (Conservative politician) (1848–1903), MP for Lewisham 1891–1903
- John Penn (architect) (1921–2007), British architect
- John Garrett Penn (1932–2007), United States federal judge
- John S. Penn (born 1926), American politician the New Jersey General Assembly
- John Penne, MP for Melcombe Regis

== See also ==
- Jack Penn (1909–1996), South African surgeon
