= Canterbury (ship) =

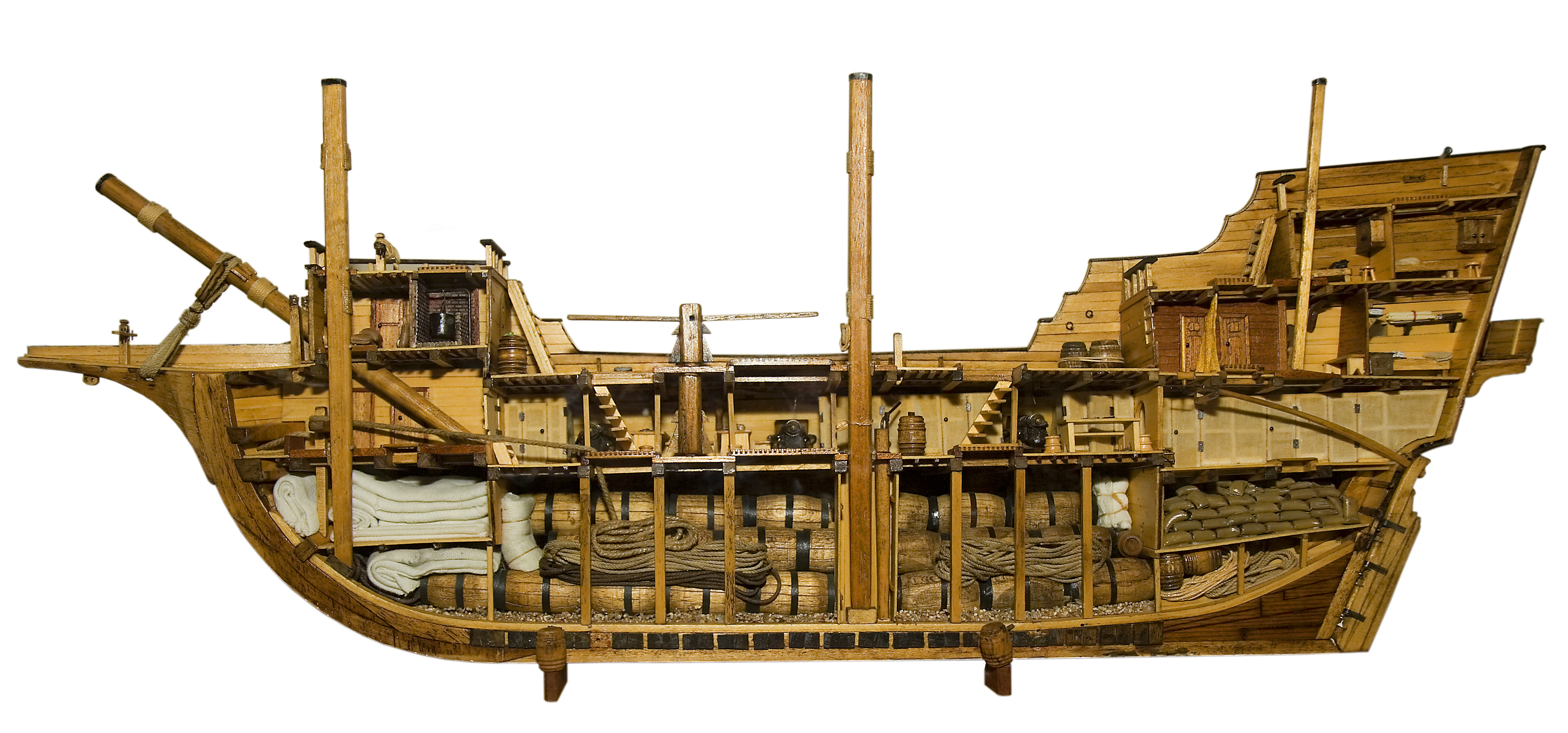
- A typical 17th century merchant ship

The Canterbury, or Canterbury Merchant, is the ship that transported Quaker Leader William Penn and his pregnant wife Hannah Callowhill. Also, Penn's twenty-one-year-old daughter, Letitia from a previous marriage. This was Penn's second visit to his Pennsylvania Colony. Penn's secretary, James Logan was also accompanying them on the voyage from England to Philadelphia in 1699. The Canterbury set sail from Cowes Isle of Wight, on September 3, 1699. Two months later, on November 3, 1699, the Canterbury docked at Newcastle, Delaware. The ship's trade goods were unloaded and new good loaded. The families rested and recovered for three weeks and on November 30, 1699, it set sail again reaching Philadelphia on 3 December 1699. The captain of the Canterbury is recorded as either "Henry Tregeny" or "Hen. Weagene". During the voyage the Canterbury reportedly survived an attack by pirates.

== Passengers ==
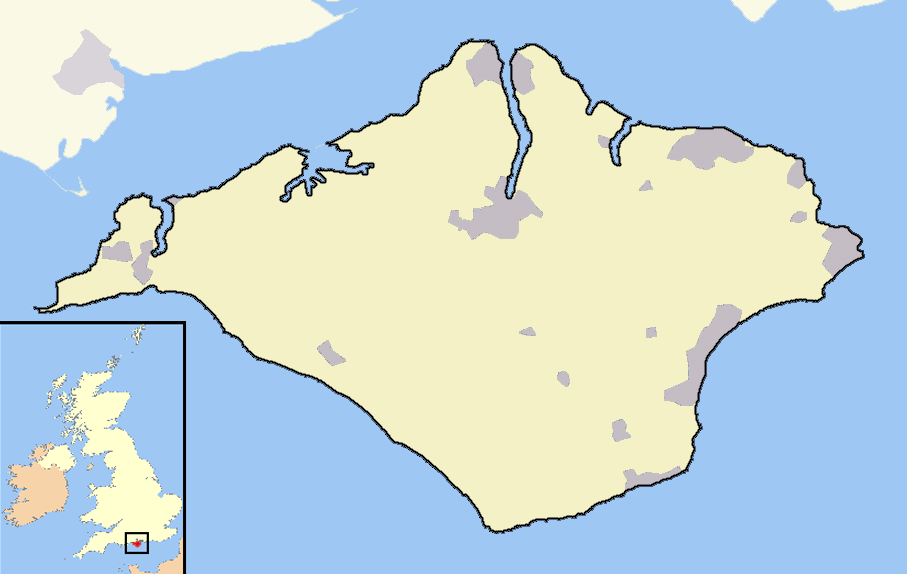
Isle of Wight

The passenger list, even if one was recorded, is not extant. Therefore, alternative sources have been used to reconstruct the list of passengers and crew.

- Confirmed:
  - William Penn, Hannah Penn (second wife of William Penn) and Letitia Penn (daughter of William Penn by his first wife)
  - James Logan, secretary to William Penn
  - Henry Tregeny or Henry Weagene
- Probable:
  - John Warder
  - Solomon Warder and Mary Howel
  - Thomas Parson
  - Randolph Janney
  - James Streater and family
  - Timothy Hudson
  - Joseph Austill
  - William Smith, wife and family
  - Samuel Sidon
  - Abraham Scott
  - Thomas Storey
  - James Barton
  - John and Rebecca Linton and family
  - Mary Doe
  - Thomas Story
  - John and Jacob Holcombe
  - Thomas and John Bye
  - John Webb
