= Springbett =

Springbett is a surname. Notable people with the surname include:

- David Springbett (born 1938), British philatelist
- Jay Dee Springbett (1975–2011), British-Australian record executive

== See also ==
- Springett
