= William Penn Jr. =

Eldest son of William Penn (1681–1720)

William Penn Jr. (14 March 1681 – 23 June 1720) was the eldest surviving son of William Penn, proprietor and founder of the colony of Pennsylvania.

== Biography ==
Penn was born on 14 March 1681, the sixth child of Penn and his first wife, Gulielma Maria Springett, in County Cork, Ireland.

At Bristol, on 12 January 1699, he married Mary Jones (1677–1733), the daughter of Charles and Martha (Wathen) Jones. His father was present at the wedding. The couple had three children.

He came to the colony with newly appointed Lieutenant-Governor John Evans, arriving February 2, 1704, and was made a member of the provincial council six days later. He raised a militia company, but, being presented before the corporation of the city of Philadelphia, the chief men in which were unfriendly to his father, for disorder at a tavern, he took offense and returned to England. He was an unsuccessful candidate for Parliament.

On his mother's side he was related to the wife of Lord Fairfax, and engaged with him and others in a project to recover sunken treasure. By various means he added to his father's financial embarrassment, and he was obliged to sell the manor of Williamstadt, which had been laid out for him at the founding of the colony. In 1708, he signed the Pennsylvania Mortgage Agreement. Around this time he formally renounced Quakerism and became a member of the Church of England.

After William Penn's death in July 1718, his second wife, Hannah Callowhill Penn, had to deal with a challenge to her husband's will. The will had provided William Jr. with the estate of Shanagarry, County Cork, Ireland, which had descended from his grandfather, Admiral William Penn, and certain other property, including all but 40,000 acres (160 km^{2}) of the American estate.

In an effort to cut Hannah and her children out of the inheritance, he waged a legal effort to contest his father's will. Although he died before the case was settled, his son Springett attempted to have the court declare the will invalid, asserting that his grandfather was mentally incompetent when he wrote it. Hannah Penn prevailed, and saw to it that her children received the estate, after payment of her husband's debts.

When she died on December 20, 1726, the proprietorship of Pennsylvania passed to her three sons: John, Thomas, and Richard.

He died of tuberculosis in Liège on 23 June 1720.
