= Springett Penn =

Springett Penn may refer to:

- Springett Penn (I) (1674–1696), second son of William Penn, founder of Pennsylvania
- Springett Penn (II) (died 1731), son of William Penn, Jr., and a grandson and heir of William Penn
