= Springett Penn (II) =

Grandson of William Penn, founder of Pennsylvania, U.S.

Springett Penn (1700 or 1701 – 8 February 1731) was a grandson and heir of William Penn, founder and proprietor of Pennsylvania.

== Biography ==
Penn was born in England, the eldest son of William Penn Jr. He succeeded to his father's claims, and was by many persons considered the rightful governor-in-chief of Pennsylvania. Sir William Keith, the lieutenant-governor, caused a tract of land, 6 miles wide and 15 miles long, on the frontier (around present-day York, Pennsylvania) to be laid out for him, and called Springettsbury Manor.

In 1725, with Hannah Callowhill Penn, his step-grandmother, the widow and executrix of the founder, he nominated Patrick Gordon as Keith's successor, and obtained confirmation of the appointment by the British Crown. The will of the founder was established by decree of the court of exchequer in 1727, and a compromise between the two branches of the family was in process of adjustment at his death.

He died in Dublin, Ireland, 8 February 1731.

== Legacy ==
Springettsbury Township, York County, Pennsylvania is named for him.
