= Springett =

Springett is a surname. Notable people with the surname include:

- Caroline Emma Springett (born 1998), Thai model and actress
- Peter Springett (1946–1997), English footballer
- Robert Springett (born 1962), British Anglican bishop
- Ron Springett (1935–2015), English footballer
- Victor George Springett (1916–1990), Australian politician

== See also ==
- Springett Penn (disambiguation), multiple people
