= No Cross, No Crown =

1669 work by William Penn

No Cross, No Crown: A Discourse, Showing the Nature and Discipline of the Holy Cross of Christ
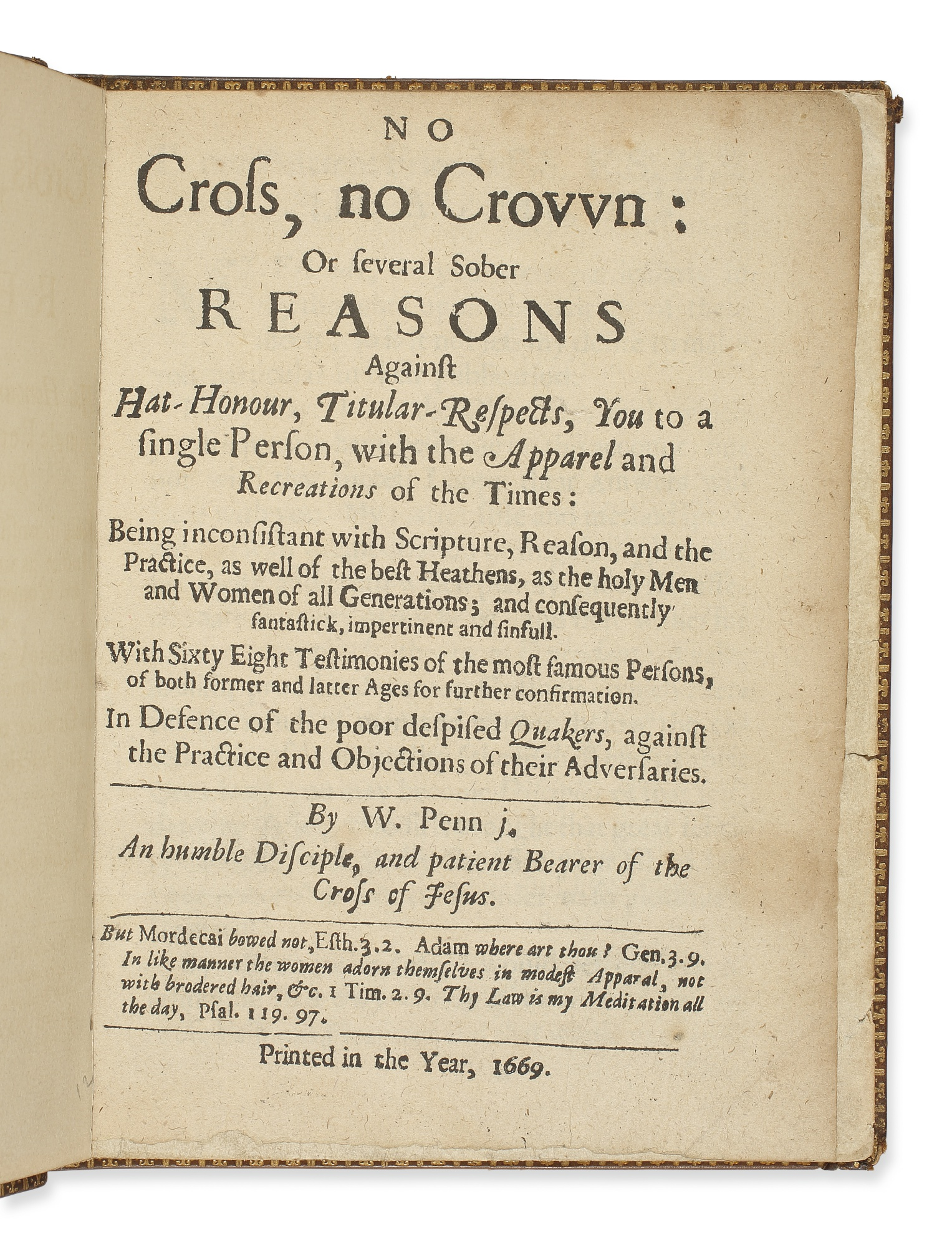
- Cover of the first edition
- Author: William Penn
- Language: English
- Published: 1669 (in English)
- Publication place: England
- Media type: Print (hardcover)

No Cross, No Crown is one of the chief works of William Penn, first published in 1669. It was written during Penn's imprisonment in the Tower of London.

== Summary ==
Penn exhorts the spirit of Primitive Christianity. The book is divided into two parts, the first dealing with the importance of self-denial in the Christian life and the second gathering a series of references to men through the ages who have written of the importance of self-denial, including "heathens," professed Christians, and "retired, aged, and dying men, being their last and serious reflections, to which no ostentation or worldly interests could induce them."

Penn's view of Christianity is intensely spiritual rather than formal, and in passing he defends several practices typical of the Religious Society of Friends (Quakers) including clothing which was not fashionable and speech which addressed royal and commoner alike in the second person singular "thee" and "thou."

== Scholarly editions ==
A 1931 scholarly edition was edited by Norman Penney.
