= Gulielma Penn =

First wife of William Penn (1644-1694)

Gulielma Maria Posthuma Penn (née Springett; February 1644 – 23 February 1694) was the first wife of William Penn, the notable Quaker writer, religious thinker and founder of Province of Pennsylvania.

== Early life ==
Gulielma was the daughter of Sir William Springett and Mary Penington (née Proude). William was born c. 1620 and studied at Catherine Hall, Cambridge, and the Inns of Court. He was knighted by King Charles I in 1642, but died on 3 February 1644 from an infection contracted just after the successful siege of Arundel. At the time, his widow was pregnant with Gulielma, who was born a few days later (but no later than 23 February).

Her first two names were Latinized versions of her parents' first names, and her third name, 'Posthuma', indicated that she was born after her father's death (and although it appeared on her father's gravestone, she did not use this name in her adult life). Her father's widow, Lady Mary, lived in London with Gulielma and Madam Springett, her mother-in-law. Lady Mary had been drawn to Protestantism during her earlier life, and had therefore refused to have Maria baptized.

At some point after Sir William's death, Lady Mary met Isaac Penington, a fellow Protestant who had also studied at Katharine Hall, Cambridge. On 13 May 1654, when Gulielma was ten, they married. Isaac's father was a wealthy Puritan fishmonger who had become Sheriff of London, Member of Parliament for the City of London and then Lord Mayor of London. He gave them a property as a wedding present, The Grange in Chalfont St Peter. However, initially they lived near Reading in Datchet, and later Caversham. They were impressed by a chance encounter with a Quaker, Thomas Curtis, both became convinced Quakers, and by 1656 Isaac had attended a Quaker meeting in Reading and soon became a pillar of the Quaker community.

On Whit Sunday in 1658 they heard the prominent Quaker George Fox preach at the country house of John Crook, a Justice of the Peace who became a Quaker, near Ridgmont in Bedfordshire. The same year the couple finally moved into The Grange, where they held their own Quaker meetings for worship. After this, locals started objecting to their presence as dissenters, abusing them, both verbally and physically, so that eventually they had to leave the Grange. Isaac was imprisoned six times and had property impropriated (i.e. taken as a penalty or for non-payment of tithes).

By the time she had reached the age of 18, Gulielma was attractive, intelligent and calm. In 1663, an old family friend, Thomas Ellwood, joined the household after having completed a prison sentence because of his Quaker beliefs. He remained there as the children's tutor until 1669, during which time he recorded in his journal that he had feelings for Gulielma. These were not reciprocated and he became betrothed to another friend, Mary Ellis. However, before they married, Mary Penington asked Ellwood to accompany Gulielma to her uncle's estate in Ringmer, Sussex, to help her attend to matters relating to property she had inherited from her father. Thomas and Mary married later that year. By now, the Peningtons were living at Bury Farm near Amersham.

== Marriage to William Penn ==
In late 1665, Penn's father had sent Penn to Ireland to manage his estates in County Cork. While there, his 'convincement' (i.e. conversion to Quakerism) happened. This resulted in a split with his father, who dismissed him from the family home. After this, Penn Jnr. spent several months in the Tower of London, having been convicted of blasphemy for publishing his second tract, The Sandy Foundation Shaken, concerning Quaker theology.

It appears that William Penn first encountered Gulielma during a visit to Bury Farm shortly after his release from the Tower, in September 1669. His father died shortly afterwards, making Penn a wealthy man. Penn and Gulielma announced their intention to marry at the Monthly Quaker Meeting on 7 February 1672, and each was visited by members of the Quaker Meeting to ensure that there would be no impediments to marriage, as was the Quaker custom. One of Penn's visitors was Thomas Ellwood. At the following Monthly Meeting, satisfactory reports were given, so Friends gave their 'consent and approbation' for the marriage to proceed, which duly went ahead on 4 April 1672, in a Chorleywood farmhouse.

After this they moved to Rickmansworth. During the early years of their marriage, William met many influential Quakers and others in his efforts to develop Quaker theology and organisation, and to have the Quaker persecution laws repealed, often accompanied by Gulielma.

== Children ==
Gulielma and William had eight children:

- Gulielma Maria b. 23 January 1673, d. 17 May 1673
- William and Mary (twins) b. February 1674, d. May 1674 and December 1674
- Springett b. 25 January 1675, d. 10 April 1696
- Letitia b. 1 March 1678, d. 6 April 1746
- William b. 14 March 1681, d. 23 June 1720
- unnamed infant b. March 1683, d. April 1683
- Gulielma Maria b. November 1685, d. November 1689

== Pennsylvania ==
After gaining the charter for Pennsylvania from Charles II, William left to establish his new colony in August 1682, leaving a pregnant Gulielma and their three children behind. Gulielma was unable to accompany him, even had he thought it appropriate, because her mother was seriously ill, and indeed died only two weeks after he left. Now an orphan, and with William's mother also having died earlier that year, she relied on the help and support of her old friend Thomas Ellwood and also George Fox's wife, Margaret with whom she had become very close. Gulielma had need of Thomas's support when she fell ill the following year. Fortunately, she recovered. Her friendship with Margaret Fox was, of necessity, maintained at a distance as they each had to oversee their homes while their husbands were away, and Margaret Fox's domicile was in Ulverston, nearly 350 miles distant. In correspondence to Fox, Gulielma suggests that she had thoughts of joining her husband in America, but these plans never came to fruition.

Penn returned from Pennsylvania in October 1684 and was kept busy writing, preaching, attending to a boundary dispute relating to his new colony, and continuing to work hard towards having the persecution of dissenters eased.

== Death ==
Gulielma appears to have been a sickly person throughout her life, suffering repeated illnesses (or flares of an underlying illness) and having sustained seven pregnancies in 13 years. Having been unwell for several months from Summer 1693, her condition deteriorated to the point that she compared her state with that of a friend 10 years older. She died on 23 February 1694, aged 50, and with her family around her. Although her illness weakened her physically, her mental function remained intact until the end. She was interred in the burial ground of Jordans Quaker Meeting.

== Character ==
John Aubrey, in his Brief Lives said of Gulielma:

She herself is described as "a comely Personage, of temper not easily moved to extremes"...the image of her Father, Sir William Springet, being "virtuous, generous, wise, humble, generally beloved for those good qualities and one more—the great cures she does, having great skill in physic and surgery, which she freely bestows".

— John Aubrey

William described his wife, in an account of her final illness and death, as follows:

...she was not only an excellent Wife and Mother, but an entire and constant Friend, of a more than common Capacity, & greater Modesty and Humility; yet most equal and undaunted in Danger. Righteous as well as Ingenuous, without Affectation. An easie Mistress and good Neighbour, especially to the Poor. Neither lavish nor penurious, but an Example of Industry, as well as of other Virtues.

— William Penn

Penn also described her as 'A woman of [i.e. in] ten thousand.'
