= Honorary citizen of the United States =

U.S. title of honor

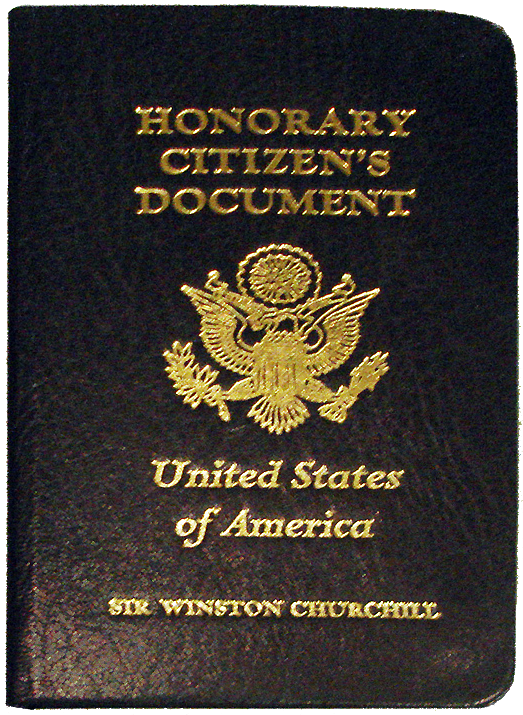
Churchill's identification document as an honorary citizen, provided as a gift from President Kennedy. Though similar in appearance, it could not function as a passport.

A person of exceptional merit who is not a United States citizen may be declared an honorary citizen of the United States by an Act of Congress or by a proclamation issued by the U.S. president, pursuant to authorization granted by the U.S. Congress.

Eight people have been so honored: six posthumously, and two, Sir Winston Churchill and Mother Teresa, during their lifetimes. For the Marquis de Lafayette and Mother Teresa, the honor was proclaimed directly by an Act of Congress. In the other cases, an Act of Congress was passed authorizing the President to grant honorary citizenship by proclamation. What rights and privileges honorary citizenship bestows, if any, are unclear. According to U.S. Department of State documents, it does not grant eligibility for U.S. passports.

Despite widespread belief that Lafayette received honorary citizenship of the United States before Churchill, he did not receive honorary citizenship until 2002. Lafayette did become a natural-born citizen during his lifetime. On December 28, 1784, the Maryland General Assembly passed a resolution stating that Lafayette and his male heirs "forever shall be...natural born Citizens" of that U.S. state. This made him a natural-born citizen of the United States under the Articles of Confederation and as defined in Section 1 of Article Two of the United States Constitution.

Lafayette boasted in 1792 that he had become an American citizen before the French Revolution created the concept of French citizenship. In 1803, President Thomas Jefferson wrote that he would have offered to make Lafayette Governor of Louisiana, had he been "on the spot". In 1932, descendant René de Chambrun established his American citizenship based on the Maryland resolution, although he was probably ineligible for the distinction, as the inherited citizenship was likely only intended for direct descendants who were heir to Lafayette's estate and title. The Board of Immigration Appeals ruled in 1955 that "it is possible to argue" that Lafayette and living male heirs became American citizens when the U.S. Constitution became effective on March 4, 1789, but that heirs born later were not U.S. citizens.

Honorary citizenship should not be confused with citizenship or permanent residency bestowed by a private bill. Private bills are, on rare occasions, used to provide relief to individuals, often in immigration cases, and are also passed by Congress and signed into law by the president. One such statute, granting Elián González U.S. citizenship, was suggested in 1999 but never enacted.

== Recipients ==
List of honorary citizens of the United States
Num.	Name	Image	Date	Nationality	Note	Ref.
1	Sir Winston Churchill (1874–1965)	Black-and-white photographic portrait of Sir Winston Churchill	April 9, 1963	United Kingdom	Prime Minister of the United Kingdom, notably during World War II.	
2	Raoul Wallenberg (born 1912, disappeared 1945)	Black-and-white photographic portrait of Raoul Wallenberg	October 5, 1981 (Note: awarded posthumously)	Sweden	Swedish diplomat who rescued Jews in Hungary from the Holocaust.	
3, 4	William Penn (1644–1718)	Black-and-white portrait of William Penn	October 19, 1984	England	Founder of the Province of Pennsylvania.	
3, 4	Hannah Callowhill Penn (1671–1726)	Portrait of Hannah Penn	October 19, 1984	England	Administrator of the Province of Pennsylvania, second wife of William Penn.	
5	Mother Teresa (1910–1997)	Photograph of Mother Teresa	October 1, 1996	India (born in present-day North Macedonia)	Catholic nun of Albanian ethnicity and Indian citizenship, who founded the Missionaries of Charity in Calcutta.	
6	Gilbert du Motier, Marquis de Lafayette (1757–1834)	Portrait of Gilbert du Motier, Marquis de Lafayette	August 6, 2002	Kingdom of France	A Frenchman who was an officer in the American Revolutionary War.	
7	Casimir Pulaski (1745–1779)	Portrait of Casimir Pulaski	November 6, 2009	Polish–Lithuanian Commonwealth	Polish military officer who saved the life of George Washington, and fought and died for the United States against the British during the American Revolutionary War; notable politician and member of the Polish–Lithuanian Commonwealth nobility, American brigadier general who has been called "The Father of the American Cavalry" and died during the Siege of Savannah. Remembered as a national hero both in Poland and in the United States.	
8	Bernardo de Gálvez (1746–1786)	Portrait of Bernardo de Gálvez	December 16, 2014	Spain	A Spanish officer and governor who was a hero of the American Revolutionary War, risking his life for the freedom of United States citizens; provided supplies, intelligence, and strong military support to the war effort; was wounded during the Siege of Pensacola, demonstrating bravery that forever endeared him to the United States soldiers.	

== See also ==
- Citizenship
- Citizenship of the United States
