= Richard Penn Sr. =

British politician (1706–1771)

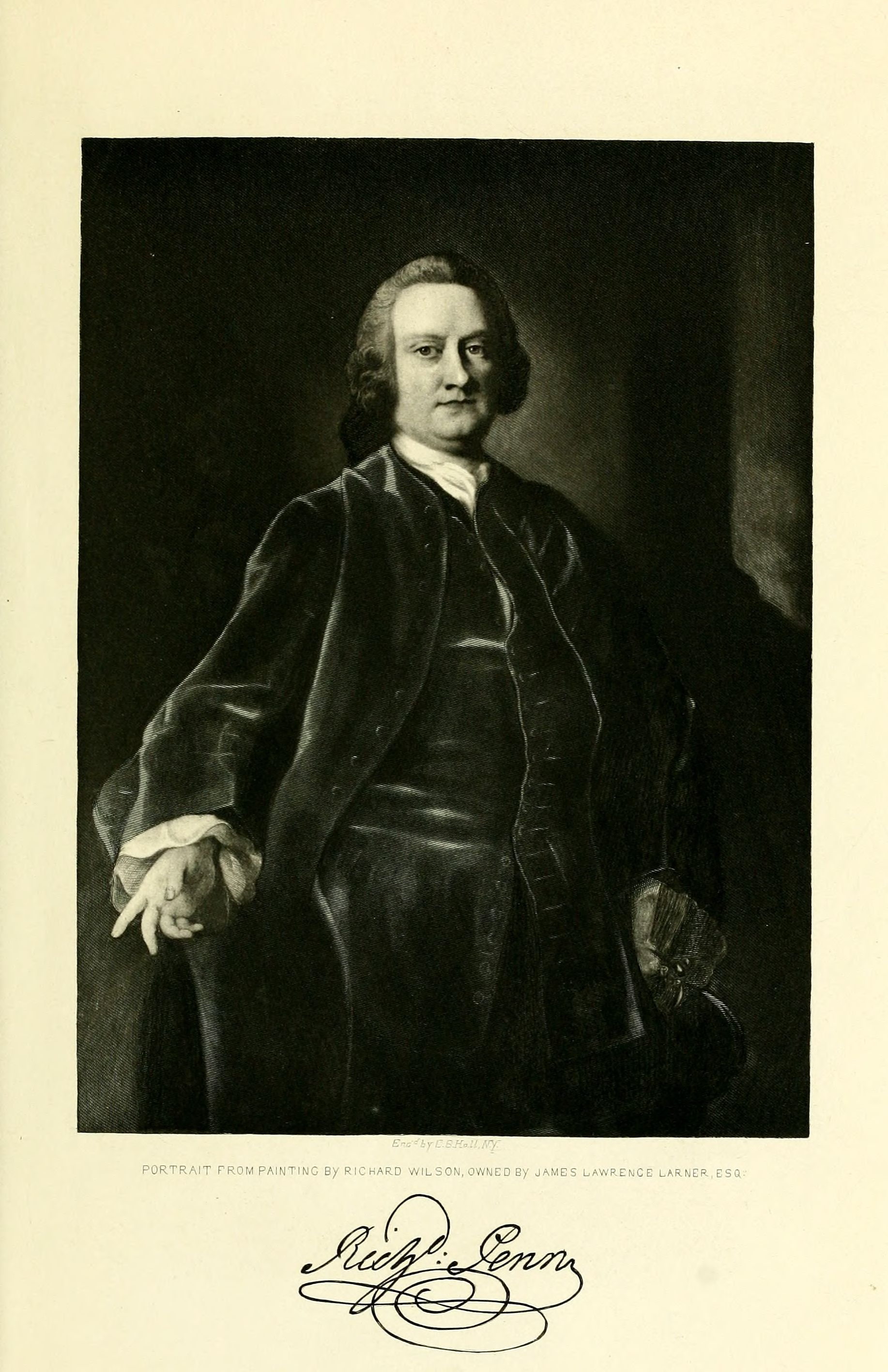

Titular Governor of The Province of Pennsylvania and the Delaware River
- In office 1746 – February 4, 1771 (his death)
- Preceded by: None
- Succeeded by: None

Personal details
- Born: 17 January 1706 Bristol, England
- Died: 4 February 1771 (aged 65) England

Richard Penn Sr. (17 January 1706 – 4 February 1771) was a proprietary and titular governor of the Province of Pennsylvania and the counties of New Castle, Kent, and Sussex, which then included present-day Delaware. He served as governor from 1746 to 1771. His father was William Penn, founder of the colonial-era Province of Pennsylvania, one of the original Thirteen Colonies in British America.

== Early life ==
Penn was born in Bristol, England, the third son of William Penn, founder of the colonial-era Province of Pennsylvania, and his second wife Hannah Margaret Callowhill.

Penn married Hannah, daughter of John Lardner, and had two sons, John and Richard, both of whom later served as governor of the Province of Pennsylvania.

== Province of Pennsylvania ==
On 12 May 1732, Penn with his brothers John and Thomas as the proprietors of Pennsylvania, signed an order to create a commission. This order was directed to Governor Gordon, Isaac Norris, Samuel Preston, James Logan, and Andrew Hamilton, and to James Steel and Robert Charles. The commission, which was to be made up of at least three or more of these individuals, was given full power on behalf of the proprietors for the "running, marking, and laying out" of any boundary between Pennsylvania and the Province of Maryland.

This was in accordance to the agreement signed between the Penn brothers and Charles Calvert, 5th Baron Baltimore on 10 May 1732.

== Death ==
Penn died in England on 4 February 1771, at age 65.
