= Robert Penn =

Robert or Rob Penn may refer to:

- Robert Penn (Medal of Honor) (1872–1912), U.S. Navy sailor and Medal of Honor recipient
- Robert Penn (musician), American blues musician
- Rob Penn (born 1967), British writer and broadcaster
- Robert Penne, MP for Weymouth and Melcombe Regis UK Parliament constituencies in the early 15th century

== See also ==
- Robert Penn Warren (1905–1989), American poet, novelist, and literary critic
