= John Penn ("the American") =

American merchant

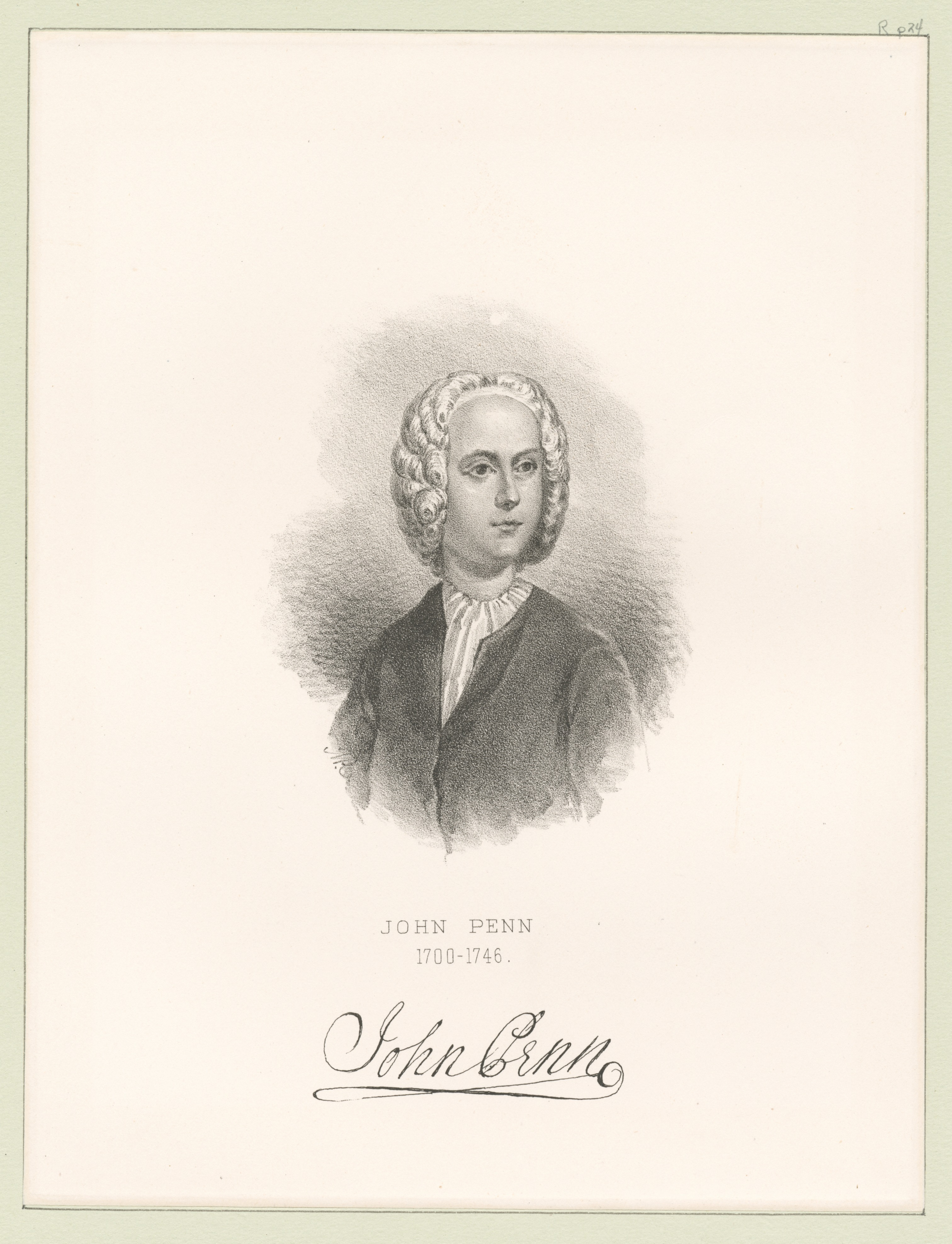

2nd Chief Proprietor of Pennsylvania
- In office 1718–1746
- Preceded by: William Penn founder (1644–1718)
- Succeeded by: Thomas Penn (1702–1775) – brother

Personal details
- Born: January 28, 1700 Slate Roof House, Philadelphia, Pennsylvania, English America
- Died: October 25, 1746 (aged 46) Hitcham, Buckinghamshire, Great Britain
- Profession: Proprietor of the Province of Pennsylvania

John Penn (January 28, 1700 (Note: Barratt (1913), in a figure caption before p. 25, gives the date February 29, 1700. Jenkins (1903, p. 374) gives the date "Jan. 29, 1699-1700" (meaning it was in 1700 if you start the year on January 1, or 1699 if you start the year on March 25, as was the custom in the American colonies at that time).) – October 25, 1746) was an American-born merchant who was proprietor of the colonial Province of Pennsylvania, which became the U.S. state of Pennsylvania following American independence obtained in victory in the American Revolutionary War.

John Penn was the eldest son of the colony's founder, William Penn (1644–1718) and his second wife, Hannah Callowhill Penn (1671–1726). He was born in the Slate Roof House in Philadelphia, and was the only one of Penn's children to be born in the present-day United States. As a result, he was referred to as "the American" by his family.

== Early life ==
Penn was born in Philadelphia and raised by a cousin in Bristol, England, where he learned the trade of merchant, specializing in linen. As a result of his father's will and by his mother's appointment, he received half of the proprietorship of the Province of Pennsylvania.

== Province of Pennsylvania ==
=== Border dispute with Maryland ===
On May 12, 1732, as proprietors of the colonial-era Province of Pennsylvania, one of the Thirteen Colonies of British America, Penn and his brothers Thomas Penn and Richard Penn signed an order creating a commission of three or more individuals they appointed that were responsible for "running, marking, and laying out" of any boundary between the Province of Pennsylvania and the colonial Province of Maryland. This was in accordance with a signed agreement between the Penn brothers and Charles Calvert, 5th Baron Baltimore.

=== Walking Purchase ===
Penn returned to the Province of Pennsylvania in September 1734 and attended the meetings of the Pennsylvania Provincial Council, but went back to England in 1735, to support the colony's rights in its boundary dispute with Maryland. The ultimate resolution of this dispute was the surveying of the Mason–Dixon line. Penn, his brother Thomas, and their agents were responsible for the Walking Purchase in which over a million acres of in the colonial areas of present-day New Jersey, southern New York state, and the Lehigh Valley and Northeastern Pennsylvania regions of Pennsylvania were swindled from the Lenape Indian tribe.

== Death ==
Penn never married and died in Hitcham, Buckinghamshire, England. He was interred at Jordans. His will left his rights to the Province of Pennsylvania and Delaware Colony to his brother Thomas Penn.

== Works cited ==
- Barratt, Norris Stanley (1913). Colonial Wars in America. Society of Colonial Wars in the Commonwealth of Pennsylvania.
- Dunaway, Wayland F. (1948). A History of Pennsylvania. New York, New York: Prentice-Hall, Inc. pp. 59, 87–88.
- Jenkins, Howard Malcolm, ed. (1903). Pennsylvania, Colonial and Federal: A History, 1608–1903. Vol. 1. Philadelphia: Pennsylvania Historical Pub. Association. p. 401.
- Philadelphia Monthly Meeting, Record of Births, Deaths, and Burials, 1688–1826. (2014) Images of manuscript. U.S., Quaker Meeting Records, 1681–1935 [database on-line]. Ancestry.com, Provo, UT.
- Proud, Robert (1798). The History of Pennsylvania in North America. Philadelphia, PA: Zachariah Paulson, Jr. pp. 208–209 – via Google Books.
- Rawle, William Brooke (1899). "The General Title of the Penn Family to Pennsylvania". Pennsylvania Magazine of History and Biography. 23.
- "Walking-Purchase". Encyclopædia Britannica.
- "William Penn". Edited Appleton's Encyclopedia. Historic.US. n.d.
