= Jack Penn =

Jack Penn (14 August 1909 – 27 November 1996), M.B., Ch.B., F.R.C.S.(E.), Mil. Dec. M.B.E., S.M., was a plastic and reconstructive surgeon, sculptor and author, who was also for a time a member of the President's Council in South Africa.

== Early years ==
Penn was born in Cape Town in 1909, the youngest of 7 children. After World War I, the family moved to Johannesburg, where he was educated at Parktown Boys' High School and the University of the Witwatersrand.

== Training ==
Married in 1934 Diana Malkin, Penn and his wife went to the United Kingdom, where he became a Fellow of the Royal College of Surgeons of Edinburgh in 1935. He worked successively at the Orthopaedic Centre in Liverpool, at the then new British Postgraduate School in London, as acting Senior Surgeon at a County Council hospital in London, and as Resident Surgical Officer at the Royal Salop Infirmary in Shrewsbury. He also spent part of 1937 at the Mayo Clinic in Rochester, in the United States of America, then returning, with a short spell in London, to Johannesburg, where he was offered a part-time appointment as lecturer in Clinical Anatomy by Prof. Raymond Dart at the University of the Witwatersrand.

== The military context: plastic and reconstructive surgery ==
Penn enlisted as a part-time officer with the rank of major in the Union Defence Force (predecessor of the South African Defence Force), being called up in 1939 as a major attached to the 7th Field Ambulance. In this capacity he went to London to help with war casualties in need of plastic and reconstructive surgery, notably during the Battle of Britain. Here, Penn trained in military plastic surgery under Sir Harold Gillies and Sir Archibald McIndoe. Returning to South Africa, he founded and was commander in charge of the Brenthurst Military Hospital. Severely damaged by fire in 1944, Brenthurst was restored and returned to its owner, Sir Ernest Oppenheimer.

Oppenheimer made possible a new Chair of Plastic, Maxillo Facial and Oral Surgery, and Dr Penn, at the age of 35, was appointed first professor of Plastic Surgery at the University of the Witwatersrand. His academic positions included visiting professorships at Oxford, Harvard, Pennsylvania, Ann Arbor, UCLA, New York, Hebrew University of Jerusalem, Hiroshima, Tokyo, and the Taiwan Army Medical Centre.

== Brenthurst Clinic ==
Penn resigned from the university in 1950 in order to found his own clinic, which he named the Brenthurst Clinic. Penn originated innovative techniques in plastic surgery, notably the Brenthurst Splint, which was standard for many years for jaw fractures.

In 1956 Penn was the moving force behind the establishment of the Association of Plastic and Reconstructive Surgery, and he was elected unanimously as its first president. He helped to initiate plastic and reconstructive surgery in other countries, including Israel (during the 1948 war), Zimbabwe (then Rhodesia), Kenya, Gabon (then French Equatorial Africa, at the invitation of Albert Schweitzer at Lambaréné), Japan (assisting Hiroshima and Nagasaki victims) and Taiwan.

Penn was also responsible for the first academic journal of plastic surgery in the English language, the Brenthurst Papers, and he authored many professional papers, editorials and book chapters in this field.

== Author and sculptor ==
It has been said that Penn was as well known for his sculpture and his writings as for his plastic surgery.

Penn's sculptures are to be seen in various places in South Africa and elsewhere. A bust of General Jan Christiaan Smuts was commissioned for the Jan Smuts Airport (now O. R. Tambo Airport), and a statue of Henrietta Stockdale, the nursing pioneer, is in the grounds of St Cyprian's Cathedral in Kimberley. His bust of Albert Schweitzer was presented to Strasbourg, while those of David Ben-Gurion and General Moshe Dayan are in Israel. He produced a bust of Joseph Lister, in England. He also made sketches and paintings. His sculpture of nurse Cecilia Makiwane was unveiled at Victoria Hospital Lovedale in 1976.

Jack Penn wrote a number of books, mainly of a philosophical nature, which include his Letters to my Son (1975) – letters that were addressed to his son John who, like himself, became a plastic and reconstructive surgeon and served as president of the American Society for Aesthetic Plastic Surgery; The Right to Look Human: an autobiography (1974); Reflections on Life (1980); and To think is to live (nd).

Penn died on 27 November 1996, aged 87 years.
