= Hannah Callowhill Penn =

Wife of William Penn (1671–1726)

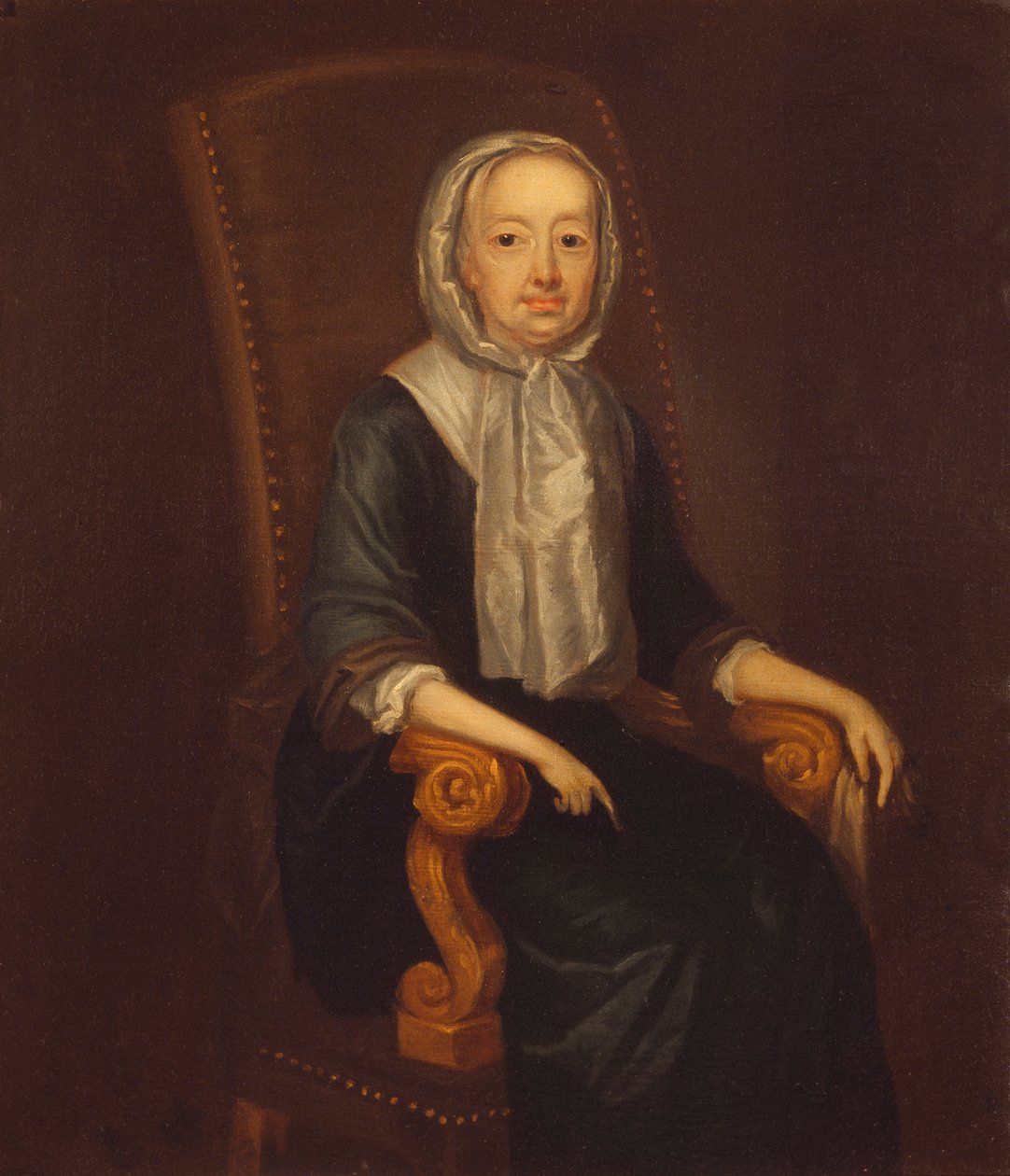
- Portrait by John Hesselius

Acting Proprietor of Pennsylvania
- In office 1712 – 30 December 1726
- Preceded by: William Penn
- Succeeded by: John Penn

De facto First Lady of Pennsylvania
- In office 1696 – 20 July 1716

Personal details
- Born: Hannah Margaret Callowhill; 11 February 1671 Bristol, England
- Died: 20 December 1726 (aged 55) London, England
- Spouse: William Penn (1696-1716)

Hannah Margaret Penn (née Callowhill; 11 February 1671 – 20 December 1726) was an Englishwoman who was the second wife of Pennsylvania founder William Penn. She effectively administered the Province of Pennsylvania for six years after her husband suffered a series of strokes, and then for another eight years after her husband's death. She served as acting proprietor from 1712 until her death in 1726.

== Early life ==
Hannah Margaret Callowhill was born in Bristol, England, the daughter of Thomas Callowhill, a merchant there, and Anna (or Hannah) Hollister.

== Province of Pennsylvania ==
A Quaker, she married William Penn on 5 March 1696, when she was 25 and he was 52 at Quakers Friars in Bristol. She was pregnant with their first of nine children when the couple embarked from England for their three-month voyage to what was then British America in 1699. She lived in great style, both in Philadelphia and at Pennsbury Manor, a beautiful estate located in Bucks County, on the Delaware River.

When William Penn died at age 73 on 30 July 1718, his will gave Hannah Penn full control of the Province of Pennsylvania and his fortune.

William Penn's oldest son by his first marriage, William Penn Jr., sought to dismiss his father's will in order to obtain control of the colony. His suit was unsuccessful, and Hannah Penn remained in charge of the colony until she died from a stroke in her son's house in London at age 55.

Her deputy in Pennsylvania from 1718 until 1727 was William Keith.

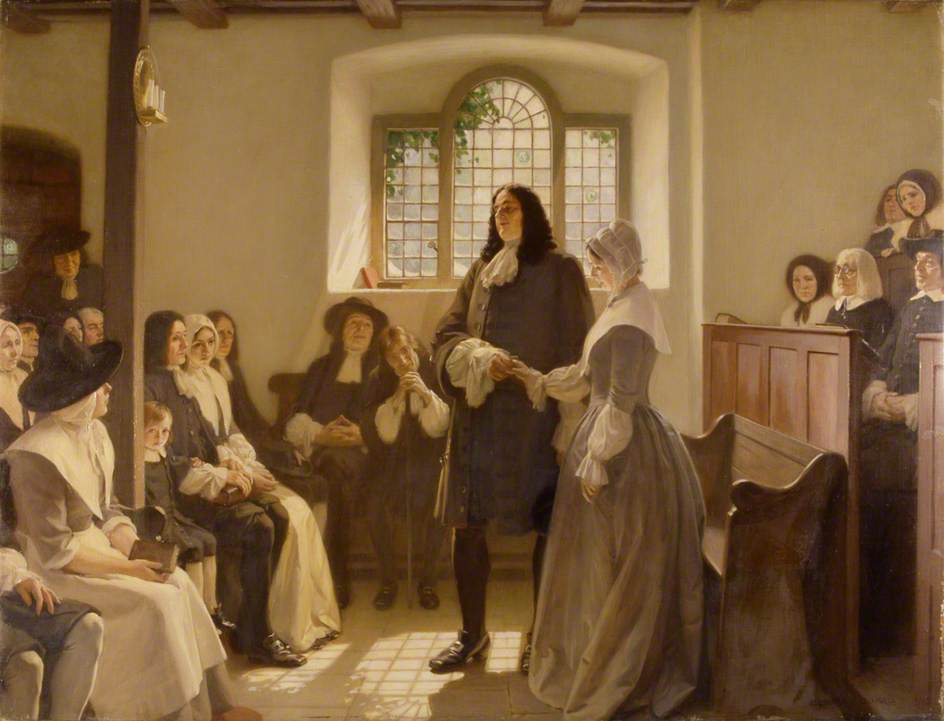
The Marriage of William Penn and Hannah Callowhill at the Friends' Meeting House in Bristol.

She is buried in the same grave as William in the Quaker burial ground at Jordans in Buckinghamshire, in England.

== Children ==
She had nine children with William Penn:

- Unnamed daughter (born and died 1697)
- John Penn ("the American") (28 January 1700 – 25 October 1746), never married
- Thomas Penn (20 March 1702 – 21 March 1775), married Lady Juliana Fermore, fourth daughter of Thomas, first Earl of Pomfret
- Hannah Penn (1703–1706)
- Margaret Penn (7 November 1704–February 1751), married Thomas Freame (1701/02-1746) nephew of John Freame, founder of Barclays Bank
- Richard Penn Sr. (17 January 1706 – 4 February 1771)
- Dennis Penn (26 February 1707 – 1723)
- Hannah Margarita Penn (1708–March 1708)
- Louis Penn

== Legacy ==
Hannah Penn is one of the eight individuals and the first woman granted the status of Honorary Citizen of the United States, awarded her by Presidential Proclamation by an Act of Congress (PL. 98-516) by Ronald Reagan on 28 November 1984.

When William Penn was laying out the city of Philadelphia in the early 1680s, he named Callowhill Street in his wife's honor. In the 21st century, the neighborhood directly north of Chinatown, which Callowhill Street passes through, became known as Callowhill. Similarly, a street in Perkasie, Pennsylvania, is also named in her honor, as Perkasie's street grid is almost a direct copy of that of center city Philadelphia. A middle school in York, Pennsylvania, is named in her honor.

Pennsylvania Governor, Tom Corbett, named 12 March 2013 "Hannah Callowhill Penn Day."

Governor Corbett and Mrs. Susan Corbett commissioned a posthumous portrait of Hannah Penn by Pennsylvania portrait artist Ellen Cooper. The portrait was unveiled at a ceremony at the Pennsylvania capitol during Women's History Month, 19 March 2014. After being publicly displayed in the governor's reception room for several months, on 15 January 2015, the portrait was hung in the Pennsylvania governor's office among portraits of other early leaders of Pennsylvania. However, as of March 2015 the portrait is in storage; Governor Tom Wolf asked for it to be moved into the governor's reception room, but he said because of safety concerns it was returned to the Historical and Museum Commission. According to Penn Live, "It is likely that it will be sent, for a time, to Pennsbury Manor, the estate from which the Penns first governed the new colony. Then, it is headed to the state museum for an exhibit on Iconic Stories of Pennsylvania."

On 19 March 2014, the Pennsylvania Commission for Women awarded the first Hannah Penn Leadership Awards to honor Pennsylvania women who have been outstanding mentors and role models through their leadership, service and commitment to empowering women and girls in the commonwealth.
