= William Penn =

English writer and religious thinker (1644–1718)

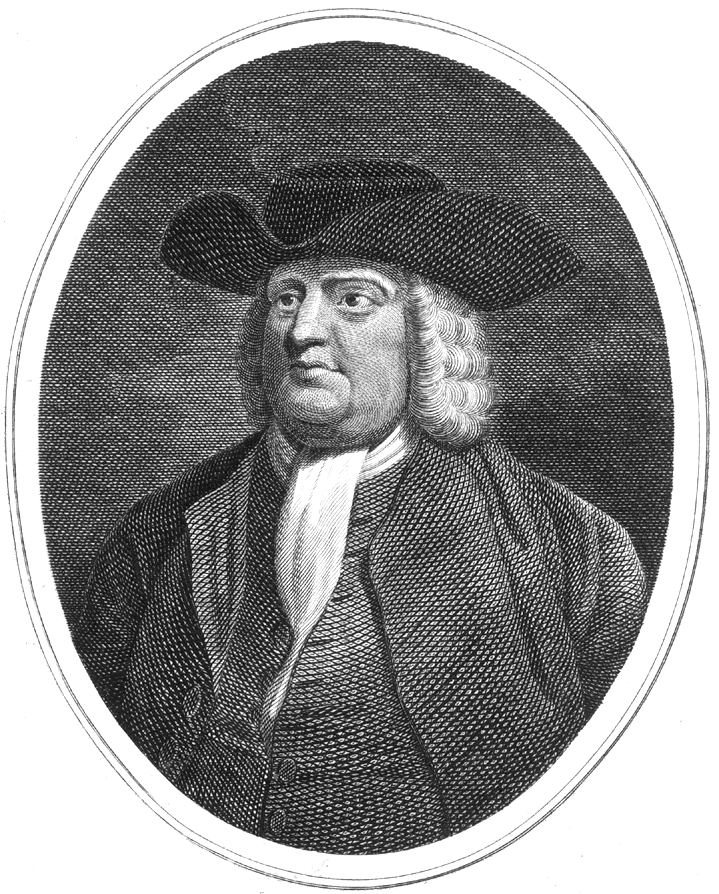
- 18th-century portrait of Penn
- Born: 14 October 1644; Tower Hill, London, England
- Died: 10 August 1718 (aged 73); Ruscombe, Berkshire, England
- Education: Christ Church, Oxford
- Occupations: Nobleman, writer, colonial proprietor of Pennsylvania, founder of Philadelphia
- Spouse(s): Gulielma Penn; Hannah Margaret Callowhill
- Children: 17, including William Jr., John, Thomas, and Richard
- Parent(s): Admiral Sir William Penn; Margaret Jasper

William Penn (24 October [O.S. 14 October] 1644 – 10 August [O.S. 30 July] 1718) was an English writer, theologian, religious thinker, and influential Quaker who founded the Province of Pennsylvania. An advocate of democracy and religious freedom, Penn was known for his amicable relations and successful treaties with the Lenape native peoples who had resided in present-day Pennsylvania before European colonisation there.

Penn was expelled from the University of Oxford in 1662 for his religious nonconformity. That early break with institutional authority became central to his life. He embraced Quakerism, defended freedom of conscience, and repeatedly challenged the established Church of England's restrictions on religious dissent. Penn built a remarkable life outside conventional institutions, combining religious leadership, writing, political advocacy, and practical enterprise. Today, his legacy is commemorated at Christ Church, Oxford, where his portrait is displayed in the dining hall.

His most important undertaking was Pennsylvania. In 1681, King Charles II granted Penn an area of land corresponding to the present-day U.S. states of Pennsylvania and Delaware to offset debts he owed to Penn's father, the admiral and politician Sir William Penn. Penn developed the land as a territory grounded in Quaker ideals of peace and equality alongside economic opportunity and representative government. The following year, Penn left England and sailed up Delaware Bay and the Delaware River, where he founded Philadelphia on the river's western bank. Penn's Quaker government was not viewed favorably by the Dutch, Swedish and English settlers in what is now Delaware, and the land was also claimed by the Calverts, proprietors of the neighbouring Province of Maryland. In 1704, the three southernmost counties of the province of Pennsylvania were granted permission to form a new, semi-autonomous Delaware Colony.

As one of the earliest supporters of colonial unification, Penn wrote and urged the union of all the British colonies into what would later become the United States. The democratic principles that he included in the West Jersey Concessions and outlined in the Pennsylvania Frame of Government inspired delegates to the 1787 Constitutional Convention in Philadelphia when they came to write the Constitution of the United States.

A man of deep religious conviction, Penn authored numerous works, exhorting believers to adhere to the spirit of primitive Christianity. Penn was imprisoned several times in the Tower of London due to his faith. His book No Cross, No Crown, published in 1669 while he was in jail, has become a classic of Christian theological literature.

== Early life ==
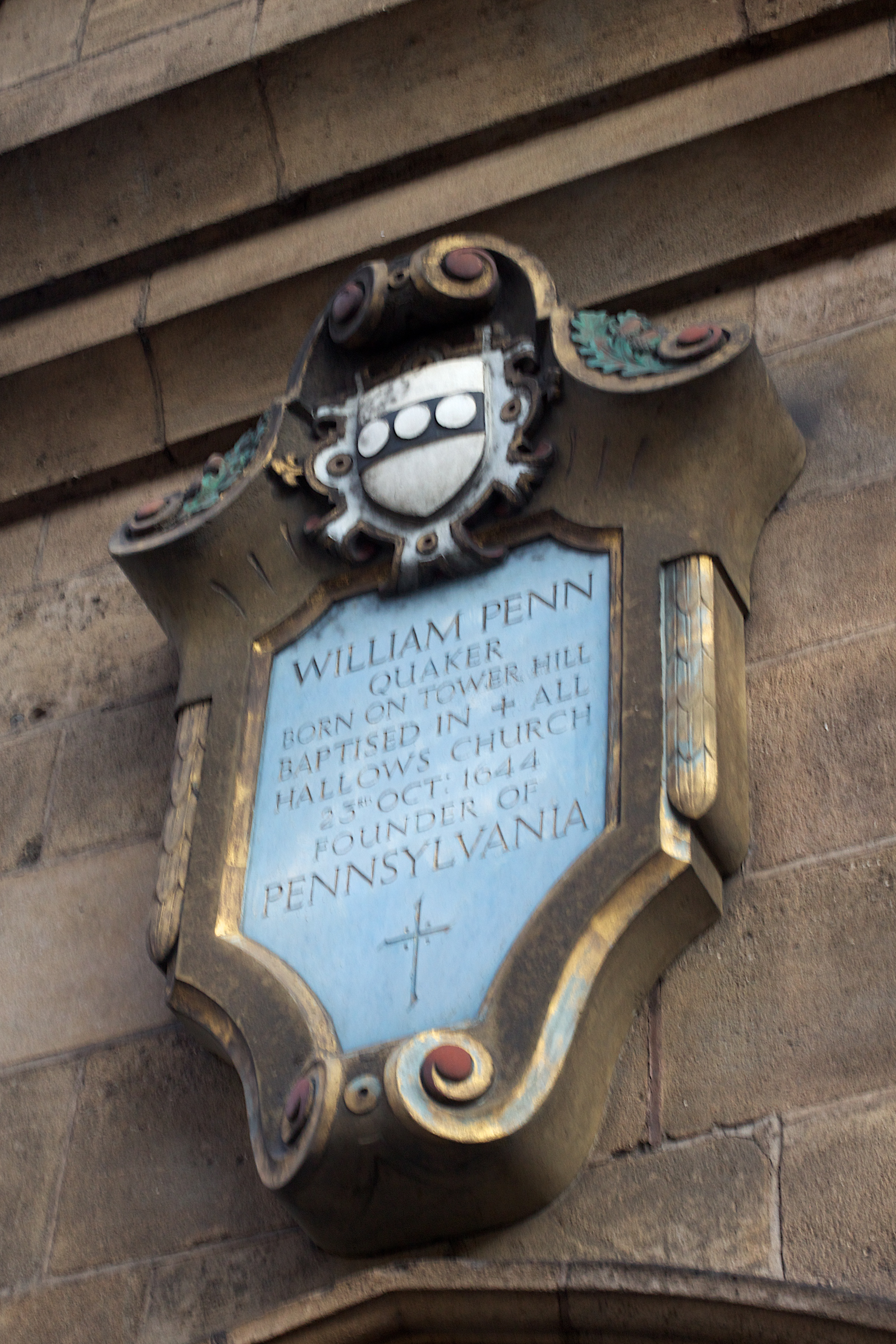
All Hallows-by-the Tower Church in London, where Penn was baptized in 1644

Penn's coat of arms, which reads, Arms: Argent, on a fess sable three bezants of the field; Crest: A demi-lion rampant, collared with the fess of the arms; Motto: Dum clavum rectum teneam (While holding to glory, let me hold to right)

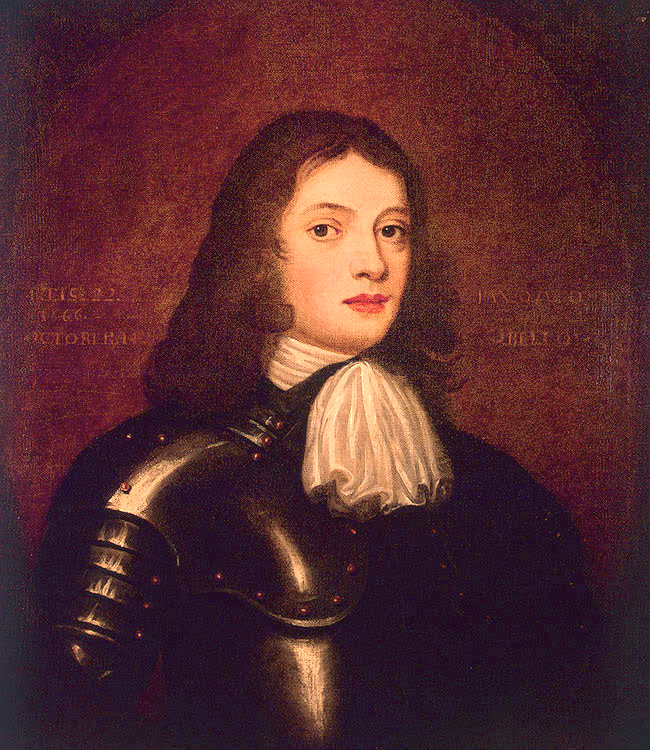
1666 portrait of Penn at age 22

Penn was born on 24 October 1644 at Tower Hill, London, the son of English naval officer Sir William Penn, and Dutchwoman Margaret Jasper, who was widow of a Dutch sea captain and the daughter of a rich merchant from Rotterdam. Through the Pletjes-Jasper family, Penn is also said to have been a cousin of the Op den Graeff family, who were important Mennonites in Krefeld and Quakers in Pennsylvania. Admiral Penn served in the Commonwealth Navy during the Wars of the Three Kingdoms and was rewarded by Oliver Cromwell with estates in Ireland. The lands given to Penn had been confiscated from Irish Confederates who had participated in the Irish Rebellion of 1641. Admiral Penn took part in the restoration of King Charles II and was eventually knighted and served in the Royal Navy. At the time of his son's birth, then-Captain Penn was twenty-three and an ambitious naval officer in charge of blockading ports held by confederate forces.

Penn grew up during the rule of Oliver Cromwell, who succeeded in leading a Puritan rebellion against King Charles I; the king was beheaded when Penn was four years old. Penn's father was often at sea. Young William caught smallpox, and lost his hair from the disease; he wore wigs for much of his life. Penn's smallpox also prompted his parents to move from the suburbs to an estate in Essex. The country life made a lasting impression on young Penn, and kindled in him a love of horticulture. Their neighbour was the diarist Samuel Pepys, who was friendly at first but later secretly hostile to the admiral, perhaps embittered in part by his failed seductions of both Penn's mother and his sister Peggy.

After a failed mission to the Caribbean, Admiral Penn and his family were exiled to his lands in Ireland when the younger Penn was about 15 years old. During this time, Penn met Thomas Loe, a Quaker missionary who was maligned by both Catholics and Protestants. Loe was admitted to the Penn household, and during his discourses on the Inward Light, young Penn recalled later that "the Lord visited me and gave me divine Impressions of Himself."

A year later, Cromwell was dead, the Royalists were resurging, and the Penn family returned to England. The middle class aligned itself with the Royalists and Admiral Penn was sent on a secret mission to bring back exiled Prince Charles. For his role in restoring the monarchy, Admiral Penn was knighted and gained a powerful position as Lord Commissioner of the Admiralty.

== Education ==
Penn was first educated at Chigwell School, then by private tutors in Ireland, and later at Christ Church at the University of Oxford in Oxford. At the time, there were no state schools and nearly all educational institutions were affiliated with the Anglican Church. Children from poorer families had to have a wealthy sponsor to get an education. Penn's education leaned heavily on the classical authors and "no novelties or conceited modern writers" were allowed, including Shakespeare.

Running was Penn's favorite sport, and he often ran more than three miles (5 km) from his home to the school, which was cast in an Anglican model and was strict, humorless, and somber. The school's teachers had to be pillars of virtue and provide sterling examples to their pupils. Penn later opposed Anglicanism on religious grounds, but he absorbed many Puritan behaviors, and was known later for his own serious demeanor, strict behavior, and lack of humor.

In 1660, Penn arrived at the University of Oxford, where he was enrolled as a gentleman scholar with an assigned servant. The student body was a volatile mix of Cavaliers, sober Puritans, and non-conforming Quakers. The new English government's discouragement of religious dissent gave the Cavaliers license to harass the minority groups. Because of his father's high position and social status, young Penn was firmly a Cavalier but his sympathies lay with the persecuted Quakers. To avoid conflict, Penn withdrew from the fray and became a reclusive scholar.

During this time, Penn developed his individuality and philosophy of life. He found that he was not sympathetic with either his father's martial view of the world or his mother's society-oriented sensibilities. "I had no relations that inclined to so solitary and spiritual way; I was a child alone. A child was given to musing, occasionally feeling the divine presence," he later said.

Penn returned home as a guest of honour at the king's lavish restoration ceremony alongside his father, who received a highly unusual royal salute for his services to the Crown. Penn's father had great hopes for his son's career under the favor of the king.

Back at Oxford, Penn considered a medical career and took some dissecting classes. Rational thought began to spread into science, politics, and economics, which he took a liking to. When theologian John Owen was fired from his deanery, Penn and other open-minded students rallied to his side and attended seminars at the dean's house, where intellectual discussions covered the gamut of new thought. Penn learned the valuable skills of forming ideas into theory, discussing theory through reasoned debate, and testing the theories in the real world.

At this time he also faced his first moral dilemma. After Owen was fired, Penn was again censured and students were threatened with punishment for associating with the theologian. However, Penn stood by the dean, thereby gaining a fine and reprimand from the university. The admiral, despairing of the charges, pulled young Penn away from Oxford, hoping to distract him from the heretical influences of the university. The attempt had no effect and father and son struggled to understand each other.

Back at school, the administration imposed stricter religious requirements including daily chapel attendance and required dress. Penn rebelled against enforced worship and was expelled. His father, in a rage, attacked young Penn with a cane and forced him from their home. Penn's mother made peace in the family, which allowed her son to return home but she quickly concluded that both her social standing and her husband's career were being threatened by their son's behavior, so at age 18 young Penn was sent to Paris to get him out of view, improve his manners, and expose him to another culture.

In Paris, at the court of young Louis XIV, Penn found French manners far more refined than the coarse ones of his countrymen, but he did not like the extravagant display of wealth and privilege he saw there. Though impressed by Notre Dame and Catholic ritual, he felt uncomfortable with it. Instead, he sought out spiritual direction from French Protestant theologian Moise Amyraut, who invited Penn to stay with him in Saumur for a year. The undogmatic Christian humanist talked of a tolerant, adapting view of religion which appealed to Penn, who later stated, "I never had any other religion in my life than what I felt." By adapting his mentor's belief in free will, Penn felt unburdened of Puritanical guilt and rigid beliefs and was inspired to search out his own religious path.

Upon returning to England after two years abroad, he presented to his parents a mature, sophisticated, well-mannered, modish gentleman, though Samuel Pepys noted young Penn's "vanity of the French". Penn had developed a taste for fine clothes, and for the rest of his life would pay somewhat more attention to his dress than most Quakers. The admiral had great hopes that his son then had the practical sense and the ambition necessary to succeed as an aristocrat. He had young Penn enroll in law school but soon his studies were interrupted.

With war with the Dutch imminent, young Penn decided to shadow his father at work and join him at sea. Penn functioned as an emissary between his father and the king, then returned to his law studies. Worrying about his father in battle he wrote, "I never knew what a father was till I had wisdom enough to prize him... I pray God... that you come home secure." The admiral returned triumphantly, but London was in the grip of the Great Plague of 1665. Young Penn reflected on the suffering and the deaths, and the way humans reacted to the epidemic. He wrote that the scourge "gave me a deep sense of the vanity of this World, of the Irreligiousness of the Religions in it." Further he observed how Quakers on errands of mercy were arrested by the police and demonized by other religions, even accused of causing the plague.

With his father laid low by gout, young Penn was sent to Ireland in 1666 to manage the family landholdings. While there, he became a soldier and took part in suppressing a local Irish rebellion. Swelling with pride, he had his portrait painted wearing a suit of armor, his most authentic likeness. His first experience of warfare gave him the sudden idea of pursuing a military career, but the fever of battle soon wore off after his father discouraged him, "I can say nothing but advise to sobriety...I wish your youthful desires mayn't outrun your discretion."

While Penn was abroad, the Great Fire of 1666 consumed central London. As with the plague, the Penn family was spared, but after returning Penn was depressed by the mood of the city and his ailing father, so he went back to the family estate in Ireland to contemplate his future. The reign of King Charles had further tightened restrictions against all religious sects other than the Anglican Church, making the penalty for unauthorized worship imprisonment or deportation. The "Five Mile Act" prohibited dissenting teachers and preachers to come within that distance of any borough. The Quakers were especially targeted and their meetings were deemed undesirable.

== Career ==
=== Religious conversion ===
Despite the dangers, Penn began to attend Quaker meetings near Cork. A chance re-meeting with Thomas Loe confirmed Penn's rising attraction to Quakerism. Soon Penn was arrested for attending Quaker meetings. Rather than state that he was not a Quaker and thereby avoid any charges, he publicly declared himself a member and finally joined the Quakers at the age of 22. In pleading his case, Penn stated that since the Quakers, unlike the Puritans, had no political agenda, they should not be subject to laws that restricted political action by minority religions and other groups.

Released from jail because of his family's rank rather than his argument, Penn was immediately recalled to London by his father. The admiral was severely distressed by his son's actions and took the conversion as a personal affront. His father's hopes that Penn's charisma and intelligence would win him favor at the court were crushed. Though enraged, the admiral tried his best to reason with his son but to no avail. His father not only feared for his own position but that his son seemed bent on a dangerous confrontation with the Crown. In the end, young Penn was more determined than ever, and the admiral felt he had no option but to order his son out of the house and to withhold his inheritance.

As Penn became homeless, he began to live with Quaker families. Quakers were relatively strict Christians in the 17th century. They refused to bow or take off their hats to social superiors, believing all men were equal under God, a belief antithetical to an absolute monarchy that believed the monarch was divinely appointed by God. As a result, Quakers were treated as heretics because of their principles and their failure to pay tithes. They also refused to swear oaths of loyalty to the king believing that this was following the command of Jesus not to swear.

The basic ceremony of Quakerism was silent worship in a meeting house, conducted in a group. There was no ritual and no professional clergy, and many Quakers disavowed the concept of original sin. God's communication came to each individual directly, and if so moved, the individual shared his revelations, thoughts, or opinions with the group. Penn found all these tenets to sit well with his conscience and his heart.

Penn became a close friend of George Fox, the founder of the Quakers, whose movement started in the 1650s during the tumult of the Cromwellian revolution. The times sprouted many new sects besides Quakers, including Seekers, Ranters, Antinomians, Seventh Day Baptists, Soul sleepers, Adamites, Diggers, Levellers, Behmenists, Muggletonians, and others, as the Puritans were more tolerant than the monarchy had been.

Following Oliver Cromwell's death, however, the Crown was re-established and the king responded with harassment and persecution of all religions and sects other than Anglicanism. Fox risked his life, wandering from town to town, and he attracted followers who likewise believed that the "God who made the world did not dwell in temples made with hands." By abolishing the church's authority over the congregation, Fox not only extended the Protestant Reformation more radically, but he helped extend the most important principle of modern political history – the rights of the individual – upon which modern democracies were later founded.

Penn travelled frequently with Fox, through Europe and England. He also wrote a comprehensive, detailed explanation of Quakerism along with a testimony to the character of George Fox, in his introduction to the autobiographical Journal of George Fox. In effect, Penn became the first theologian, theorist, and legal defender of Quakerism, providing its written doctrine and helping to establish its public standing.

=== Ireland (1669–1670) ===
In 1669, Penn travelled to Ireland to deal with his father's estates. While there, he attended many meetings and stayed with leading Quaker families. He became a great friend of William Morris, a leading Quaker figure in Cork, and often stayed with Morris at Castle Salem near Rosscarbery.

=== Germany (1671–1677) ===
From 1671 to 1677, Penn visited Germany on behalf of the Quaker faith, resulting in a German settlement in the Province of Pennsylvania that was symbolic in two ways: It was a German-speaking congregation, and it included religious dissenters. During the colonial era, Pennsylvania was the heartland for various branches of Anabaptists, like the Ephrata Cloister and the Brethren, and groups that later became the Old Order Amish and the Old Order Mennonites.

Pennsylvania quickly emerged as the home for many Lutheran refugees from Catholic provinces, such as Salzburg, and for German Catholics, who were facing discrimination in their home country.

In Philadelphia, Francis Daniel Pastorius negotiated the purchase of 15,000 acres (61 km^{2}) from his friend William Penn, the proprietor of the province of Pennsylvania, and laid out the settlement of what is the present-day Germantown section of Philadelphia. In 1764, the German Society of Pennsylvania was established, which still functions to this day from its headquarters in Philadelphia.

=== Persecutions and imprisonments ===
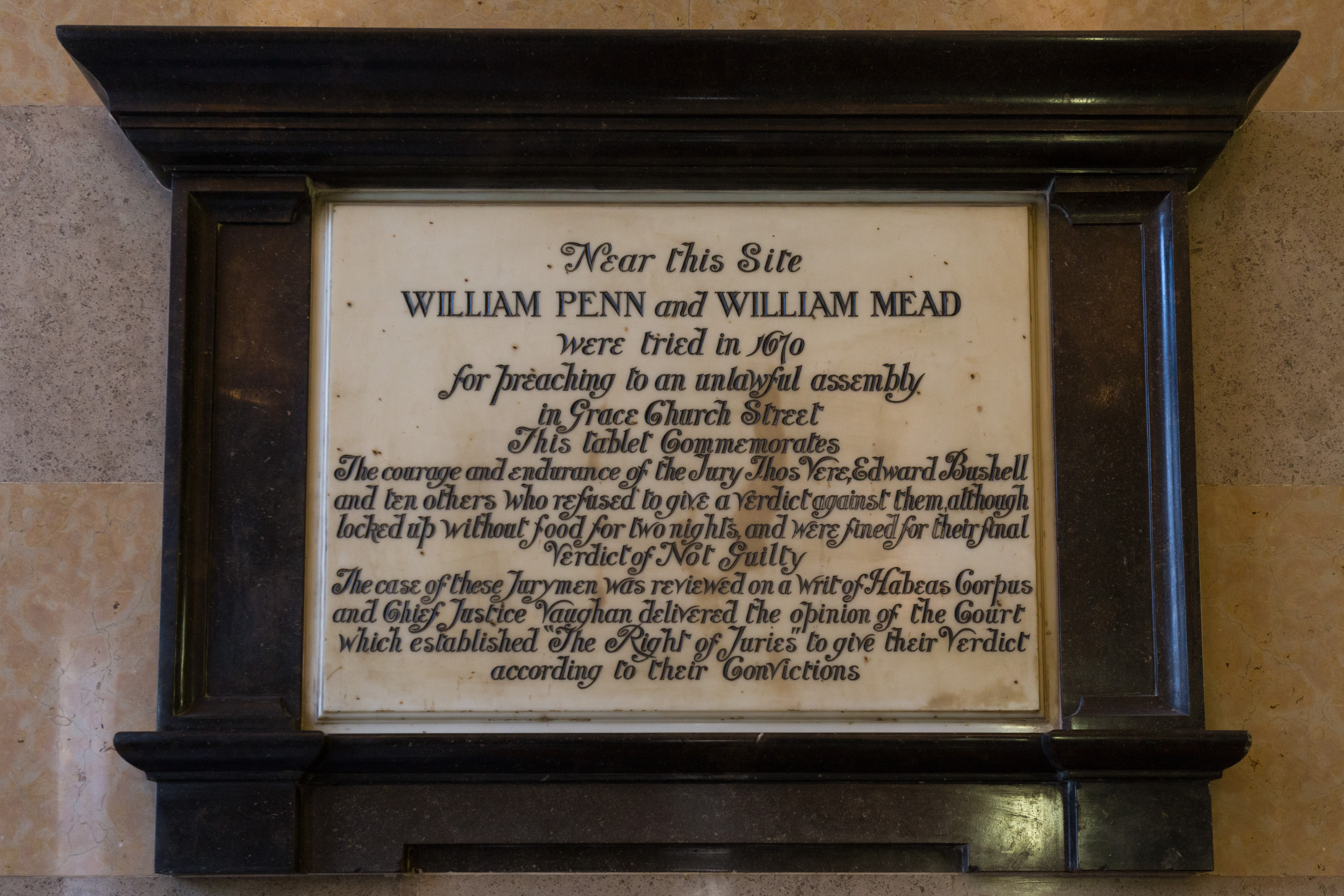
A plaque memorializing Penn's trial at Old Bailey; in 1688, Penn was imprisoned and held in solitary confinement in the Tower of London following his publication criticizing the practices of the Catholic Church and Church of England.

In 1668, Penn published the first of many pamphlets, Truth Exalted: To Princes, Priests, and People. He was a critic of all religious groups, except Quakers, which he saw as the only true Christian group at that time in England. He branded the Catholic Church "the Whore of Babylon", defied the Church of England, and called the Puritans "hypocrites and revelers in God". He lambasted all "false prophets, tithe mongers, and opposers of perfection". Pepys thought it a "ridiculous nonsensical book" that he was "ashamed to read".

In 1668, after writing a follow-up tract, The Sandy Foundation Shaken, Penn was imprisoned in the Tower of London. The Bishop of London ordered that Penn be held indefinitely until he publicly recanted his written statements. The official charge was publication without a license, but the real crime was blasphemy, as signed in a warrant by King Charles II. Placed in solitary confinement in an unheated cell and threatened with a life sentence, Penn was accused of denying the Trinity, though this was a misinterpretation Penn himself refuted in the essay Innocency with her open face, presented by way of Apology for the book entitled The Sandy Foundation Shaken, where he sought to prove the godhead of Christ.

Penn said the rumor had been "maliciously insinuated" by detractors who wanted to create a bad reputation to Quakers.

Penn later said that what he really denied were the Catholic interpretations of this theological topic, and the use of non-biblical concepts to explain it. Penn expressly confessed he believed in the Holy Three and the divinity of Christ.

In 1668, in a letter to the anti-Quaker minister Jonathan Clapham, Penn wrote: "Thou must not, reader, from my querying thus, conclude we do deny (as he hath falsely charged us) those glorious Three, which bear record in heaven, the Father, Word, and Spirit; neither the infinity, eternity and divinity of Jesus Christ; for that we know he is the mighty God."

Given writing materials in the hope that he would put on paper his retraction, Penn wrote another inflammatory treatise, No Cross, No Crown. In it, Penn exhorted believers to adhere to the spirit of primitive Christianity. This work was remarkable for its historical analysis and citation of 68 authors whose quotations and commentary he had committed to memory and was able to summon without any reference material at hand. Penn petitioned for an audience with the king, which was denied but which led to negotiations on his behalf by one of the royal chaplains. Penn declared, "My prison shall be my grave before I will budge a jot: for I owe my conscience to no mortal man." He was released after eight months of imprisonment.

Penn demonstrated no remorse for his aggressive stance and vowed to keep fighting against the wrongs of the church and the king. For its part, the Crown continued to confiscate Quaker property and jailed thousands of Quakers. From then on, Penn's religious views effectively exiled him from English society; he was expelled from Christ Church, a college at the University of Oxford, for being a Quaker, and was arrested several times. In 1670, he and William Mead were arrested. Penn was accused of preaching before a gathering in the street, which Penn deliberately provoked to test the validity of the 1664 Conventicle Act, just renewed in 1670, which denied the right of assembly to "more than five persons in addition to members of the family, for any religious purpose not according to the rules of the Church of England".

Penn was assisted by his solicitor, Thomas Rudyard, an eminent London Quaker lawyer, and pleaded for his right to see a copy of the charges laid against him and the laws he had supposedly broken, but the Recorder of London, Sir John Howel, on the bench as chief judge, refused, although this was a right guaranteed by law. Furthermore, the Recorder directed the jury to come to a verdict without hearing the defense.

Despite heavy pressure from Howel to convict Penn, the jury returned a verdict of "not guilty". When invited by the Recorder to reconsider their verdict and to select a new foreman, they refused and were sent to a cell over several nights to mull over their decision. The Lord Mayor of London, Sir Samuel Starling, also on the bench, then told the jury, "You shall go together and bring in another verdict, or you shall starve", and not only had Penn sent to jail in Newgate Prison (on a charge of contempt of court for refusing to remove his hat), but the full jury followed him, and they were additionally fined the equivalent of a year's wages each. The members of the jury, fighting their case from prison in what became known as Bushel's Case, managed to win the right for all English juries to be free from the control of judges. This case was one of the more important trials that shaped the concept of jury nullification and was a victory for the use of the writ of habeas corpus as a means of freeing those unlawfully detained.

With his father dying, Penn wanted to see him one more time and patch up their differences. He urged his father not to pay his fine and free him, saying, "I entreat thee not to purchase my liberty," but the admiral refused to let the opportunity pass and he paid the fine, releasing his son.

His father had gained respect for his son's integrity and courage and told him, "Let nothing in this world tempt you to wrong your conscience." The admiral also knew that after his death young Penn would become more vulnerable in his pursuit of justice. In an act which not only secured his son's protection but also set the conditions for the founding of Pennsylvania, the admiral wrote to the Duke of York, the heir to the throne.

The duke and the king, in return for the admiral's lifetime of service to the Crown, promised to protect young Penn and make him a royal counsellor.

Penn inherited a large fortune, but found himself in jail again for six months. In April 1672, after being released, he married Gulielma Springett following a four-year engagement filled with frequent separations. Penn remained close to home but continued writing his tracts, espousing religious tolerance and railing against discriminatory laws. A minor split developed in the Quaker community between those who favored Penn's analytical formulations and those who preferred Fox's simple precepts, but the persecution of Quakers had accelerated and the differences were overridden; Penn again resumed missionary work in Holland and Germany.

=== Founding of Pennsylvania ===
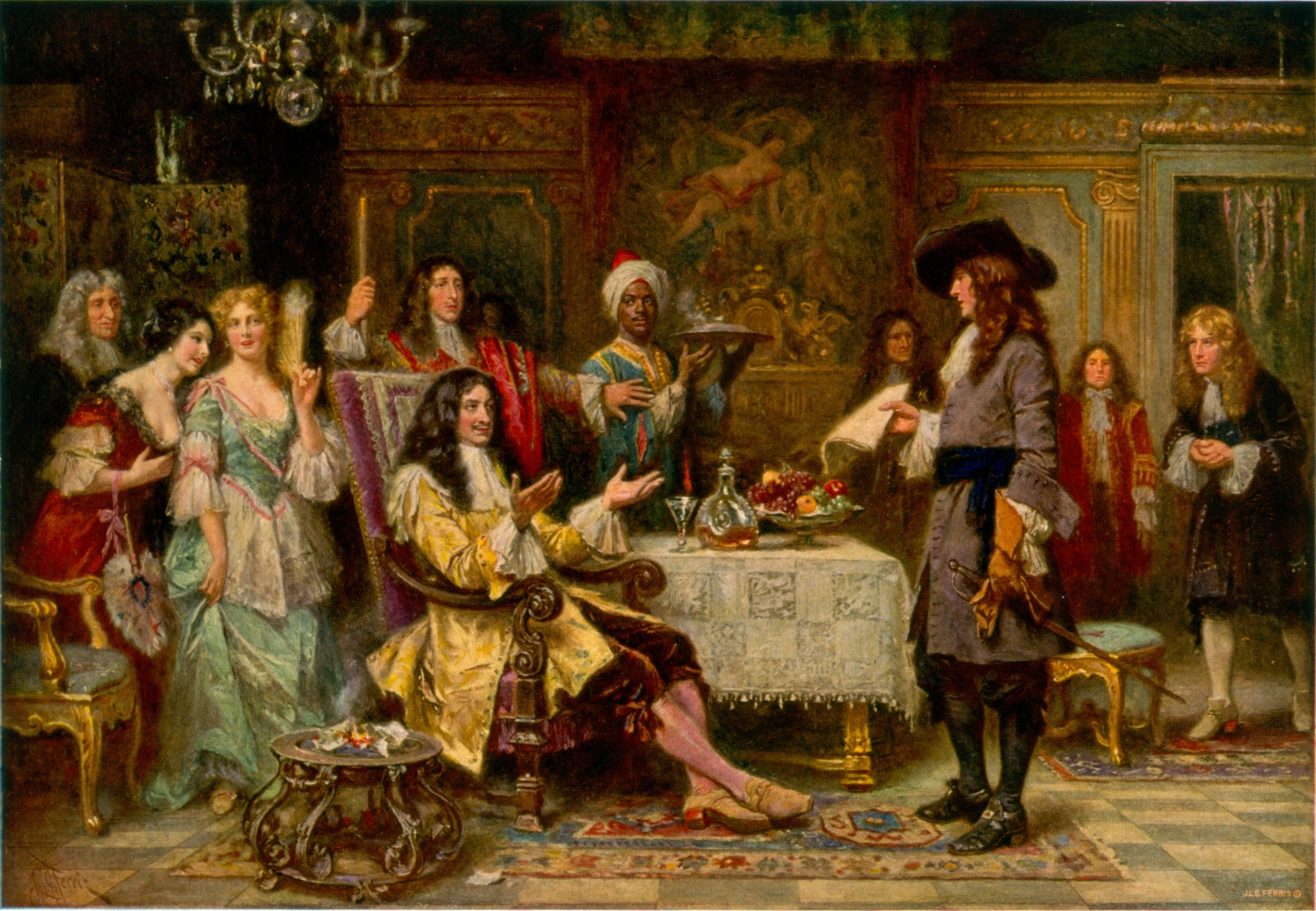
The Birth of Pennsylvania, a 1680 portrait by Jean Leon Gerome Ferris, featuring Penn facing King Charles II

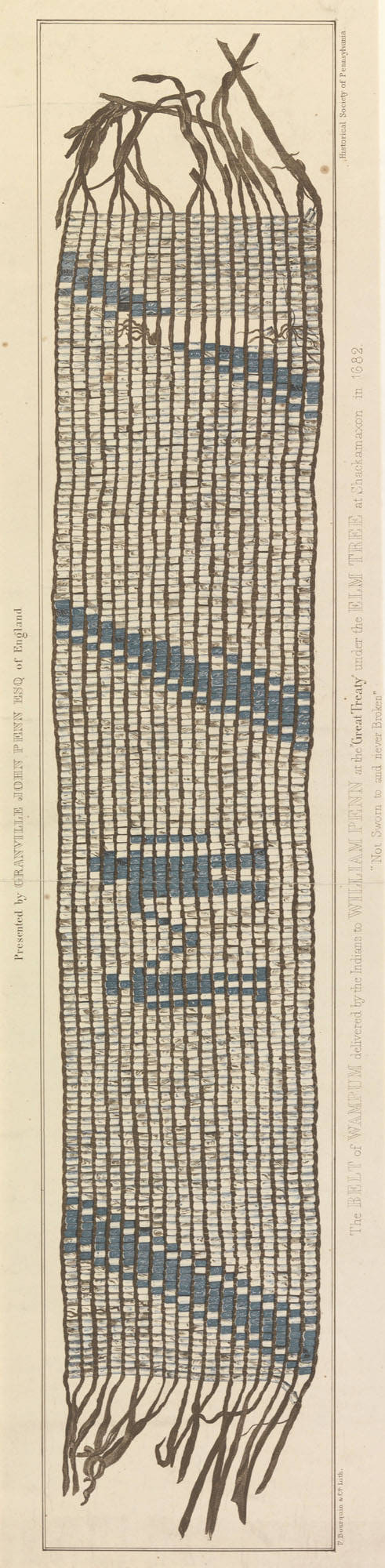
The belt of wampum delivered to Penn by Native Americans at the signing of the Great Treaty in 1682

Seeing conditions deteriorating, Penn appealed directly to the king and the duke, proposing a mass emigration of English Quakers. Some Quakers had already moved to North America, but the New England Puritans, especially, were as hostile towards Quakers as Anglicans in England were, and some of the Quakers had been banished to the Caribbean.

In 1677, a group of prominent Quakers that included Penn purchased the colonial province of West Jersey, comprising the western half of present-day New Jersey. The same year, 200 settlers from Chorleywood and Rickmansworth in Hertfordshire, and other towns in nearby Buckinghamshire arrived, and founded the town of Burlington. Fox made a journey to America to verify the potential of further expansion of the early Quaker settlements. In 1682, East Jersey was also purchased by Quakers.

With the Province of New Jersey in place, Penn pressed his case to extend the Quaker region. Whether from personal sympathy or political expediency, to Penn's surprise, the king granted an extraordinarily generous charter which made Penn the world's largest private non-royal landowner, with over 45,000 square miles (120,000 km^{2}). Penn became the sole proprietor of a huge tract of land west of New Jersey and north of the Province of Maryland belonging to Lord Baltimore, and gained sovereign rule of the territory with all rights and privileges with the exception of the power to declare war. The land of Pennsylvania had belonged to the Duke of York, but he retained the Province of New York and the area around present-day New Castle, Delaware, and the eastern portion of the Delmarva Peninsula. In return, one-fifth of all gold and silver mined in the province, which had virtually none, was to be remitted to the King, and the Crown was freed of a debt to the Admiral of £16,000, equal to roughly £2,952,623 in 2025.

Penn first called the area "New Wales", then "Sylvania", which is Latin for "forests" or "woods", which King Charles II changed to "Pennsylvania" in honour of the elder Penn. On 4 March 1681, the king signed the charter and the following day Penn jubilantly wrote, "It is a clear and just thing, and my God who has given it to me through many difficulties, will, I believe, bless and make it the seed of a nation." Penn then travelled to America and while there, he negotiated Pennsylvania's first land-purchase survey with the tribe of the Lenape people. Penn purchased the first tract of land under a white oak tree at Graystones in 1682. Penn drafted a charter of liberties for the settlement creating a political utopia guaranteeing free and fair trial by jury, freedom of religion, freedom from unjust imprisonment and free elections.

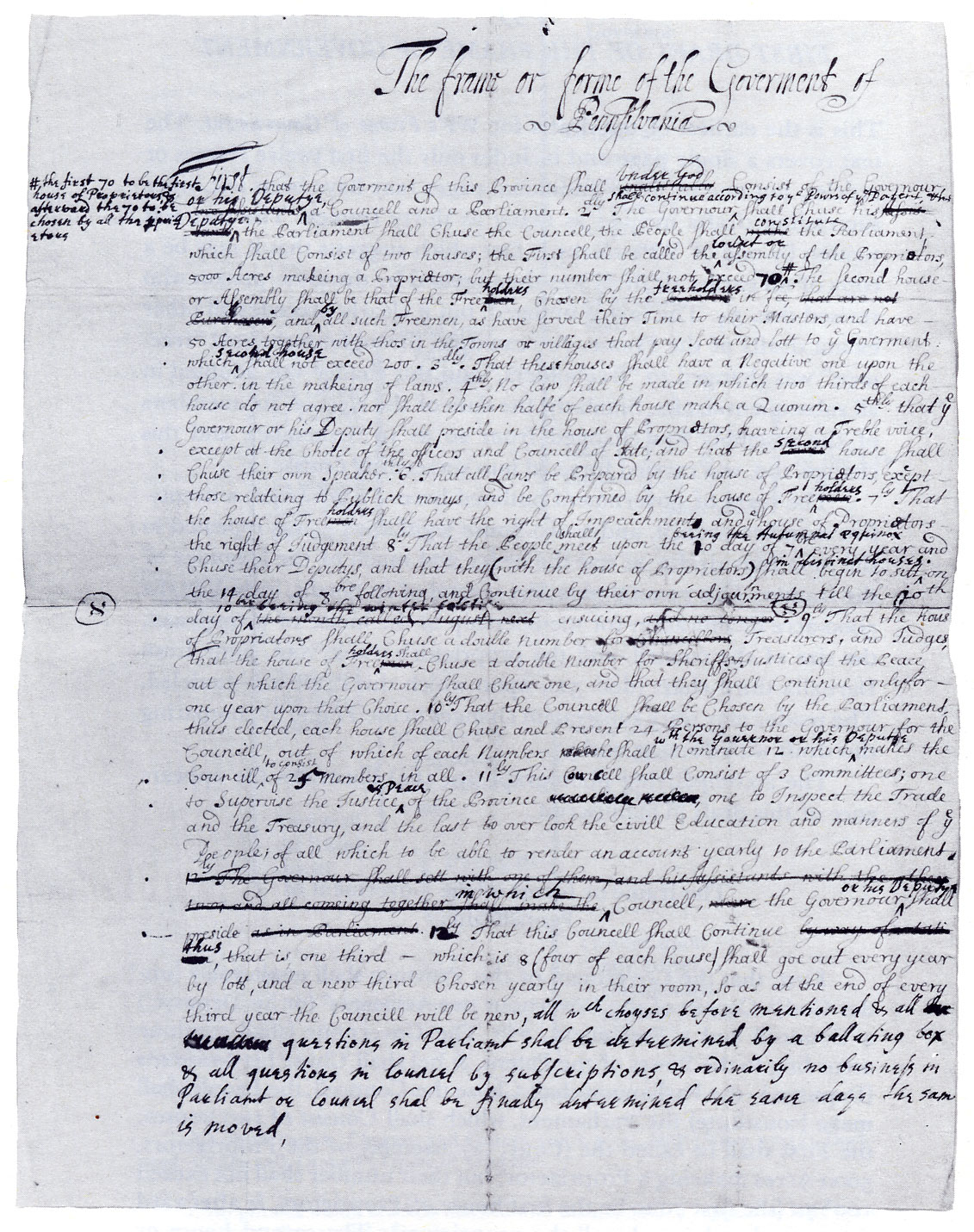
The first draft of the Frame of Government of Pennsylvania, written by Penn in England in 1681

Having proved himself an influential scholar and theoretician, Penn now had to demonstrate the practical skills of a real estate promoter, city planner, and governor for his "Holy Experiment", the province of Pennsylvania.

In addition to his religious goals, Penn had hoped that Pennsylvania would be a profitable venture for himself and his family, with the caveat that he would not exploit either the natives or the immigrants, "I would not abuse His love, nor act unworthy of His providence, and so defile what came to me clean." To that end, Penn's land purchase from the Lenape included the latter party's retained right to traverse the sold lands for purposes of hunting, fishing, and gathering.

Though thoroughly oppressed, getting Quakers to leave England and make the dangerous journey to the New World was his first commercial challenge. Some Quaker families had already arrived in Maryland and New Jersey but the numbers were small. To attract settlers in large numbers, he wrote a glowing prospectus, considered honest and well-researched for the time, promising religious freedom as well as material advantage, which he marketed throughout Europe in various languages. Within six months, he parceled out 300,000 acres (1,200 km^{2}) to over 250 prospective settlers, mostly rich London Quakers. Eventually he attracted other persecuted minorities including Huguenots, Mennonites, Amish, Catholics, Lutherans, and Jews from England, France, Holland, Germany, Sweden, Finland, Ireland, and Wales.

Penn then began establishing the legal framework for an ethical society where power was derived from the people, from "open discourse", in much the same way as a Quaker meeting was run. Notably, as the sovereign, Penn thought it important to limit his own power as well. The new government would have two houses, safeguard the rights of private property and free enterprise, and impose taxes fairly. It called for death for only two crimes, treason and murder, rather than the two hundred crimes under English law, and all cases were to be tried before a jury. Prisons would be progressive, attempting to correct through "workshops" rather than through hellish confinement. The laws of behavior he laid out were rather Puritanical: swearing, lying, and drunkenness were forbidden as well as "idle amusements" such as stage plays, gambling, revels, masques, cock-fighting, and bear-baiting.

All this was a radical departure from the laws and the lawmaking of European monarchs and elites. Over 20 drafts, Penn labored to create his "Framework of Government", with the assistance of Thomas Rudyard, the London Quaker lawyer who assisted Penn in his defense during the Penn-Mead case in 1670, and was later deputy-governor of East New Jersey. He borrowed liberally from John Locke who later had a similar influence on Thomas Jefferson, but added his own revolutionary idea – the use of amendments – to enable a written framework that could evolve with the changing times. He stated, "Governments, like clocks, go from the motion men give them."

Penn hoped that an amendable constitution would accommodate dissent and new ideas and also allow meaningful societal change without resorting to violent uprisings or revolution. Remarkably, though the Crown reserved the right to override any law it wished, Penn's skillful stewardship did not provoke any government reaction while Penn remained in his province. Despite criticism by some Quaker friends that Penn was setting himself above them by taking on this powerful position, and by his enemies who thought he was a fraud and "falsest villain upon earth", Penn was ready to begin the "Holy Experiment". Bidding goodbye to his wife and children, he reminded them to "avoid pride, avarice, and luxury".

Under Penn's direction, Philadelphia was planned and developed and emerged as the largest and most influential city in the Thirteen Colonies. Philadelphia was planned out to be grid-like with its streets and be very easy to navigate, unlike London. The streets are named with numbers and tree names.

In December 1683 (Julian calendar), Penn presided over the trial of Margaret Mattson, a Swedish-Finnish settler accused of witchcraft in Chester County. The proceedings took place in Philadelphia. The jury found her guilty only of having the "common fame" of a witch, but not guilty of practicing witchcraft, which was the extent of the charge that could be legally sustained at the time. While the case has often been highlighted as an example of Penn's procedural fairness, it has also been argued that the trial functioned as a political tool, used to subjugate dissenting Swedish-Finnish settlers and to facilitate a land seizure connected to disputes over Matson family property.

=== Return to England ===
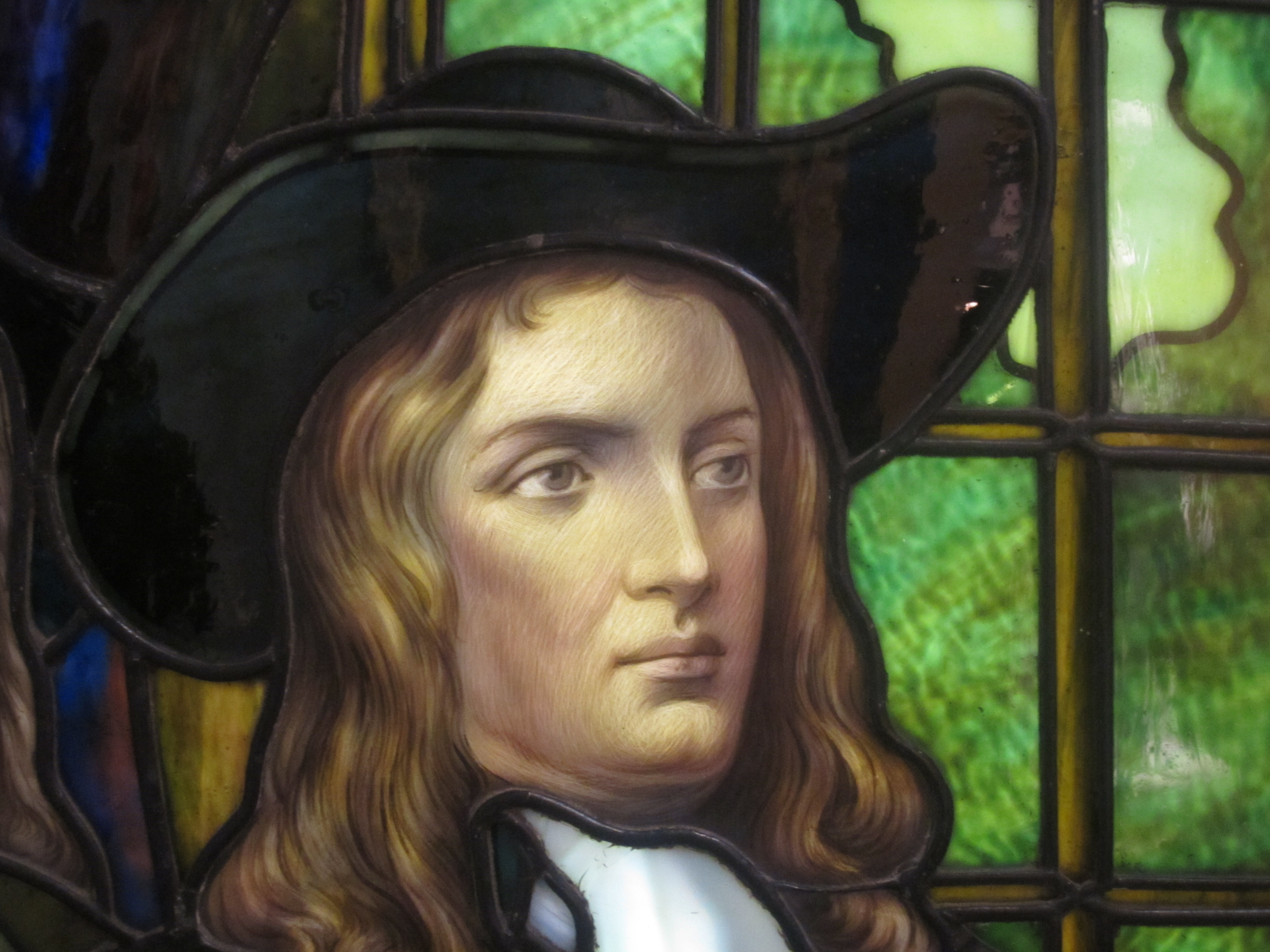
Frederick S. Lamb's portrait of Penn now on display at the Brooklyn Museum

In 1684, Penn returned to England to see his family and to try to resolve a territorial dispute with Lord Baltimore. Penn did not always pay attention to details and had not taken the fairly simple step of determining where the 40th degree of latitude (the southern boundary of his land under the charter) actually was. After he sent letters to several landowners in Maryland advising the recipients that they were probably in Pennsylvania and not to pay any more taxes to Lord Baltimore, trouble arose between the two proprietors. This led to an eighty-year legal dispute between the two families.

Political conditions at home had stiffened since Penn left. To his dismay, he found Bridewell and Newgate prisons filled with Quakers. Internal political conflicts even threatened to undo the Pennsylvania charter. Penn withheld his political writings from publication as "The times are too rough for print."

In 1685 King Charles died, and the Duke of York was crowned James II. The new king resolved the border dispute in Penn's favor. But King James, a Catholic with a largely Protestant parliament, proved a poor ruler, stubborn and inflexible. Penn supported James' Declaration of Indulgence, which granted toleration to Quakers, and went on a "preaching tour through England to promote the King's Indulgence". His proposal at the London Yearly Meeting of the Society of Friends in June 1688 to establish an "advisory committee that might offer counsel to individual Quakers deciding whether to take up public office" under James II was rebuffed by George Fox, who argued that it was "not safe to conclude such things in a Yearly Meeting". Penn offered some assistance to James II's campaign to regulate the parliamentary constituencies by sending a letter to a friend in Huntingdon asking him to identify men who could be trusted to support the king's campaign for liberty of conscience.

Penn faced serious problems in the colonies due to his sloppy business practices. Apparently, he could not be bothered with administrative details, and his business manager, fellow Quaker Philip Ford, embezzled substantial sums from Penn's estates. Ford capitalized on Penn's habit of signing papers without reading them. One such paper turned out to be a deed transferring ownership of Pennsylvania to Ford who then demanded a rent beyond Penn's ability to pay.

=== Return to America ===
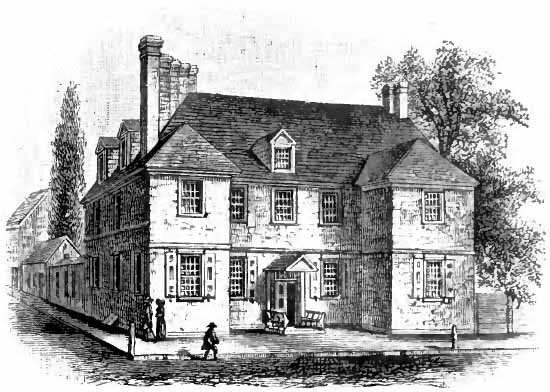
Slate Roof House in Philadelphia, one of two homes Penn used during his second stay in America, fell into disrepair; in 1867, it was demolished.

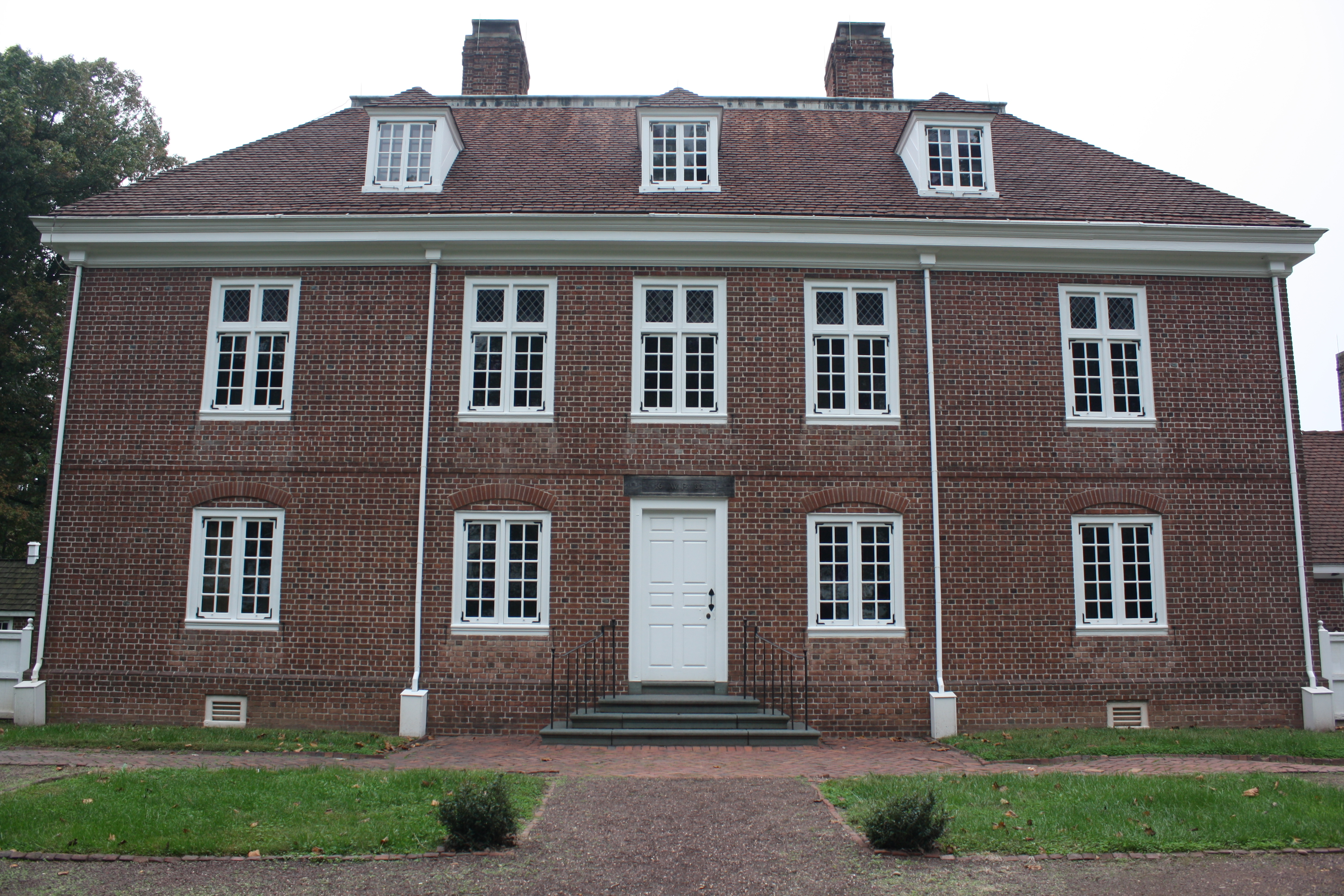
Pennsbury Manor in Tullytown, Pennsylvania, built in 1683. It was Penn's home from 1699 to 1701.

After agreeing to let Ford keep all his Irish rents in exchange for remaining quiet about Ford's legal title to Pennsylvania, Penn felt his situation sufficiently improved to return to Pennsylvania with the intention of staying. Accompanied by his second wife Hannah, daughter Letitia and secretary James Logan, Penn sailed from the Isle of Wight on the Canterbury, reaching Philadelphia in December 1699.

Penn received a hearty welcome upon his arrival and found his province much changed in the intervening 18 years. Pennsylvania grew rapidly. It had nearly 18,100 inhabitants, and Philadelphia had over 3,000. His tree plantings were providing the green urban spaces he had envisioned. Shops were full of imported merchandise, satisfying the wealthier citizens and proving America to be a viable market for English goods. Most importantly, religious diversity was succeeding. Despite the protests of fundamentalists and farmers, Penn's insistence that Quaker grammar schools be open to all citizens was producing a relatively educated workforce. High literacy and open intellectual discourse led to Philadelphia becoming a leader in science and medicine. Quakers were especially modern in their treatment of mental illness, decriminalizing insanity and turning away from punishment and confinement. One attempt at prison reform, solitary confinement, was later found to be less humane than originally hoped.

The tolerant Penn transformed himself almost into a Puritan, in an attempt to control the fractiousness that had developed in his absence, tightening up some laws. Another change was found in Penn's writings, which had mostly lost their boldness and vision. In those years, he did put forward a plan to make a federation of all English colonies in America. There have been claims that he also fought slavery, but that seems unlikely, as he owned and even traded slaves himself and his writings do not support that idea. However, he promoted some policies that would seem to provide more humane treatment for slaves, including marriage among slaves, though rejected by the council. Other Pennsylvania Quakers were more outspoken and proactive, being among the earliest fighters against slavery in America, led by Francis Daniel Pastorius and Abraham op den Graeff, founders of Germantown, Pennsylvania. Pastorius, Op den Graeff, his brother Derick op den Graeff, both of whom were Penn's cousins, and Garret Hendericks, signed the 1688 Germantown Quaker Petition Against Slavery. Many Quakers pledged to release their slaves upon their death, including Penn, and some sold their slaves to non-Quakers.

The Penns lived comfortably at Pennsbury Manor and had all intentions of living out their lives there. They also had a residence in Philadelphia. Their only American child, John, had been born and was thriving. Penn was commuting to Philadelphia on a six-man barge, which he admitted he prized above "all dead things".

James Logan, his secretary, kept him acquainted with all the news. Penn had plenty of time to spend with his family and still attend to affairs of state, though delegations and official visitors were frequent. His wife, however, did not enjoy life as a governor's wife and hostess and preferred the simple life she led in England. When new threats by France again put Penn's charter in jeopardy, Penn decided to return to England with his family, in 1701.

=== Later years ===
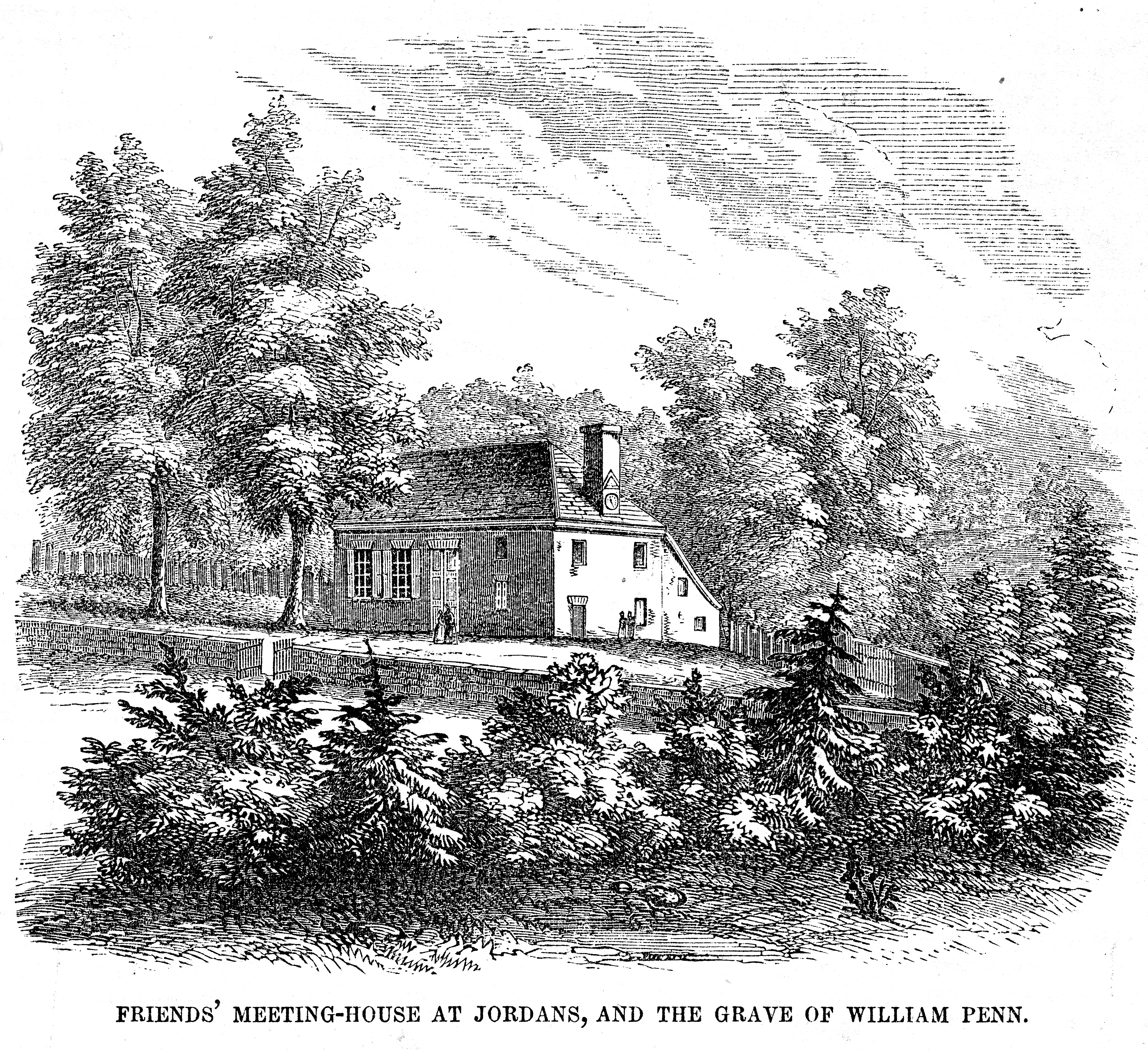
Friends' Meeting House in Jordans, Buckinghamshire, where Penn is buried

Penn returned to England and immediately became embroiled in financial and family troubles. His eldest son William Jr. was leading a dissolute life, neglecting his wife and two children, and running up gambling debts. Penn had hoped to have William succeed him in America. Now he could not even pay his son's debts. His own finances were in turmoil. He had sunk over £30,000 (equal to £5,898,872 today) in America and received little back except for some bartered goods. He had made many generous loans which he failed to press.

Philip Ford, Penn's financial advisor, cheated Penn out of thousands of pounds by concealing and diverting rents from Penn's Irish lands, claiming losses, then extracting loans from Penn to cover the shortfall. When Ford died in 1702, his widow Bridget threatened to sell Pennsylvania, to which she claimed title. Penn sent William to America to manage affairs, but he proved just as unreliable as he had been in England. There were considerable discussions about scrapping his constitution. In desperation, Penn tried to sell Pennsylvania to The Crown before Bridget Ford got wind of his plan, but by insisting that the Crown uphold the civil liberties that had been achieved, he could not strike a deal. Ford took her case to court. At age 62, Penn landed in debtors' prison; however, a rush of sympathy reduced Penn's punishment to house arrest, and Bridget Ford was finally denied her claim to Pennsylvania. A group of Quakers arranged for Ford to receive payment for back rents and Penn was released.

In 1712, Berkeley Codd, Esq. of Sussex County, Delaware disputed some of the rights of Penn's grant from the Duke of York. Some of William Penn's agents hired lawyer Andrew Hamilton to represent the Penn family in this replevin case. Hamilton's success led to an established relationship of goodwill between the Penn family and Andrew Hamilton. Penn had grown weary of the politicking back in Pennsylvania and the restlessness with his governance, but Logan implored him not to forsake his colony, for fear that Pennsylvania might fall into the hands of an opportunist who would undo all the good that had been accomplished. During his second attempt to sell Pennsylvania back to the Crown in 1712, Penn suffered a stroke. A second stroke several months later left him unable to speak or take care of himself. He slowly lost his memory.

== Death ==
In 1718, at age 73, Penn died penniless, at his home in Ruscombe, near Twyford in Berkshire, and is buried in a grave next to his first wife, Gulielma, in the cemetery of the Jordans Quaker meeting house near Chalfont St Giles in Buckinghamshire. His second wife, Hannah, as sole executor, became the de facto proprietor until she died in 1726.

=== Family ===
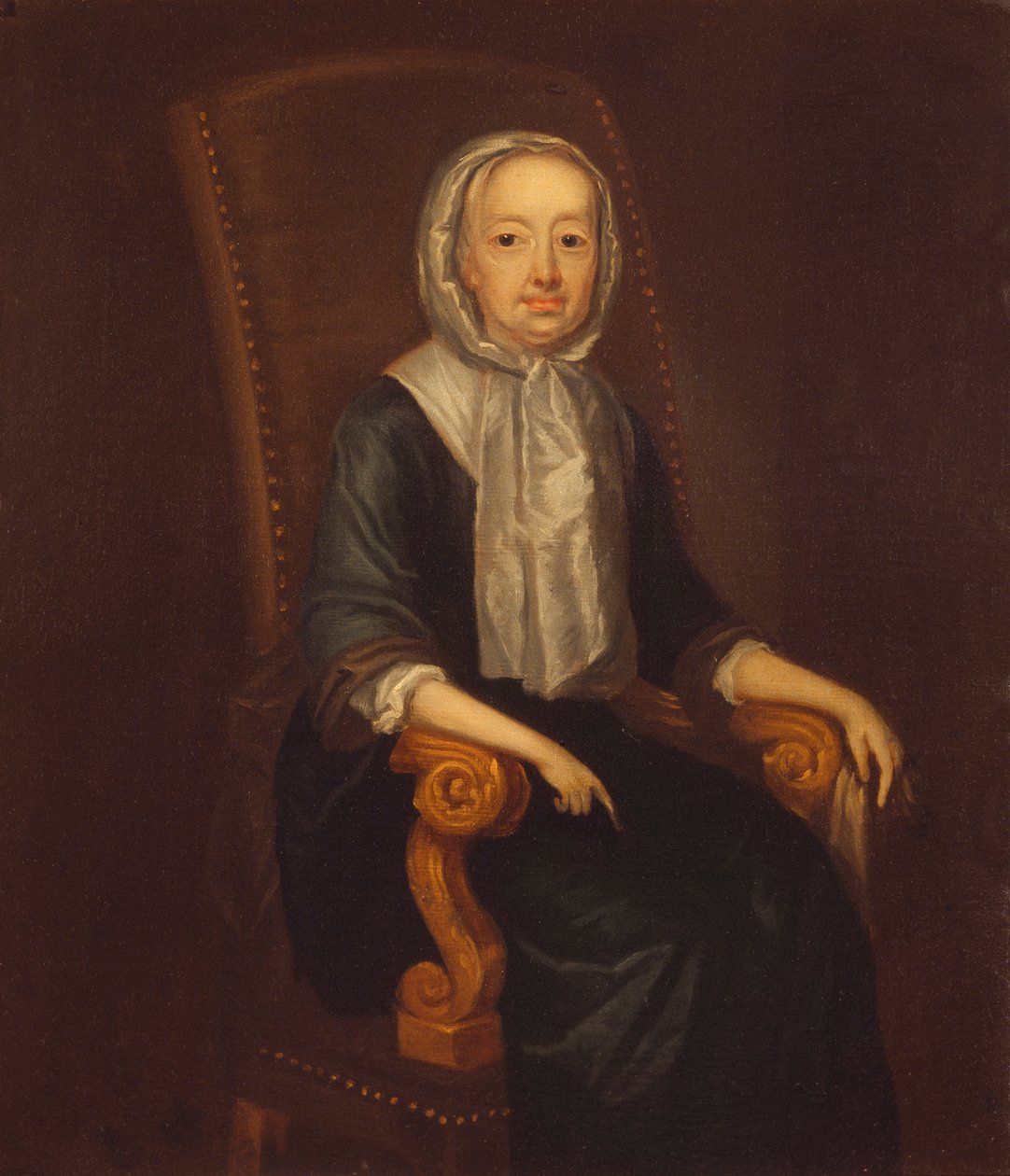
Penn's second wife, Hannah Callowhill Penn

Penn first married Gulielma Posthuma Springett (1644–1694), daughter of William S. Springett and Lady Mary Proude Penington. (The Posthuma in her name indicates that her father had died prior to her birth.) They had three sons and five daughters:

- Gulielma Maria (23 January 1673 – 17 May 1673)
- William and Mary (or Maria Margaret) (twins) (born February 1674 and died May 1674 and December 1674)
- Springett (25 January 1675 – 10 April 1696)
- Letitia (1 March 1678 – 6 April 1746), who married William Awbrey (Aubrey)
- William Jr. (14 March 1681 – 23 June 1720)
- Unnamed child (born March 1683 and died April 1683)
- Gulielma Maria (November 1685–November 1689)

Two years after Gulielma's death he married Hannah Margaret Callowhill (1671–1726), daughter of Thomas Callowhill and Anna (Hannah) Hollister. William Penn married Hannah when she was 25 and he was 52. They had nine children in twelve years:

- Unnamed daughter (born and died 1697)
- John Penn (28 January 1700 – 25 October 1746), who never married
- Thomas Penn (20 March 1702 – 21 March 1775), married Lady Juliana Fermor, fourth daughter of Thomas, first Earl of Pomfret
- Hannah Penn (1703–1706)
- Margaret Penn (7 November 1704–February 1751), married Thomas Freame (1701/02–1746) nephew of John Freame, founder of Barclays Bank
- Richard Penn Sr. (17 January 1706 – 4 February 1771)
- Dennis Penn (26 February 1707 – 1723)
- Hannah Margarita Penn (1708–March 1708)
- Louis Penn

== Legacy ==
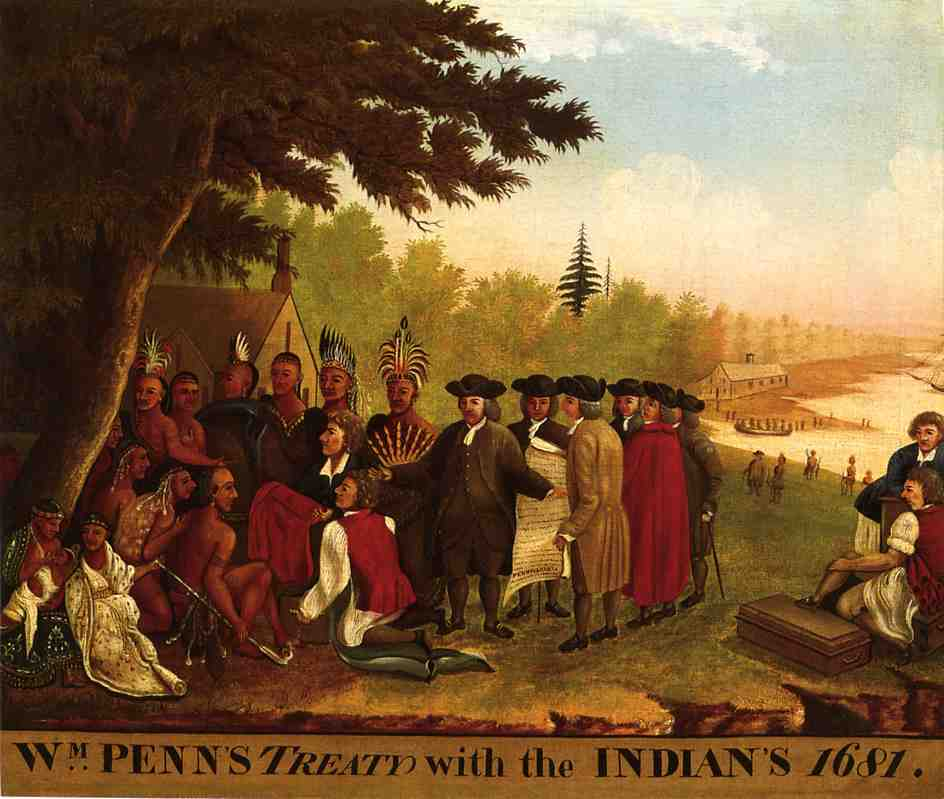
The Treaty of Penn with the Indians, an 1847 portrait depicting Penn and his group's mostly amicable interactions with the Native Americans

According to American historian Mary Maples Dunn:

Penn liked money and although he was certainly sincere about his ambitions for a "holy experiment" in Pennsylvania, he also expected to get rich. He was, however, extravagant, a bad manager and businessman, and not very astute in judging people and making appointments... Penn was gregarious, had many friends, and was good at developing the useful connections which protected him through many crises. Both his marriages were happy, and he would describe himself as a family man, all the public affairs took him away from home a great deal and he was disappointed in those children whom he knew as adults.

After Penn's death, the Province of Pennsylvania in the Thirteen Colonies slowly drifted away from a colony founded by religion to a secular state dominated by commerce. Many of Penn's legal and political innovations took root, however, as did the Quaker school in Philadelphia for which Penn issued two charters (1689 and 1701). The institution, a notable secondary school and the world's oldest Quaker school, was later renamed the William Penn Charter School in Penn's honour.

Voltaire praised Pennsylvania as the only government in the world that responds to the people and is respectful of minority rights. Penn's "Frame of Government" and his other ideas were later studied by Benjamin Franklin and Thomas Paine, whose father was a Quaker. Among Penn's legacies was his unwillingness to force a Quaker majority upon Pennsylvania, allowing his state to develop into a successful melting pot, with multiple religions. Thomas Jefferson and other multiple Founding Fathers adopted Penn's theory of an amendable constitution and his vision that "all Persons are equal under God", as he informed the federal government following the American Revolution. In addition to his extensive political and religious treatises, Penn also authored nearly 1,000 maxims, full of observations about human nature and morality.

Penn's family retained ownership of the province of Pennsylvania until the end of the American Revolution and Revolutionary War. However, William's son and successor, Thomas Penn, and his brother John, renounced their father's faith, and fought to restrict religious freedom (particularly for Catholics and later Quakers as well). Thomas weakened or eliminated the elected assembly's power, and ran Pennsylvania instead through governors who he appointed. He was a bitter opponent of Benjamin Franklin, and Franklin's push for greater democracy in the years leading up to the American Revolution. Through the Walking Purchase in 1737, the Penns cheated the Lenape out of their lands in the Lehigh Valley.

As a pacifist Quaker, Penn considered the problems of war and peace deeply. He developed a proposal for a United States of Europe through the creation of a European Assembly made of deputies who could discuss and adjudicate controversies peacefully. He is considered the first intellectual to suggest the creation of a European Parliament and what became the present-day European Union in the late 20th century.

Penn was seen by later Quakers as a theologian in his own right, on the same level as founder George Fox and apologist Isaac Penington. During the Gurneyite-Wilburite schism in 1840s American Quakerism, the heads of the conflicting parties, Joseph John Gurney and John Wilbur, both used Penn's writings in the defense of their religious views.

Quakers began publicly questioning Penn's legacy after the murder of George Floyd, with much of the concern being about Penn's active involvement in the slave trade. It was reported in January 2021, for example, that Friends Committee on National Legislation was changing the name of the William Penn House in Washington, D.C., citing his slave ownership as the reason. The building underwent renovations and was reopened as Friends Place in January 2022. Some, such as Kathleen Bell, have broadened the scope of inquiry to include the power he had over society more broadly. Bell wrote a 2022 article about Friends House, a Quaker-run building in London, removing Penn's name from a room. While most of her article is devoted to debunking reasons others had given for retaining the name, she also wrote, "Quaker businesses tended to succeed through a family's slow accumulation of wealth. Many Quaker business owners took advantage of the huge wealth gap between rich and poor; it enabled them to display their benevolence and also to control many aspects of their workers' lives."

== Posthumous honours ==
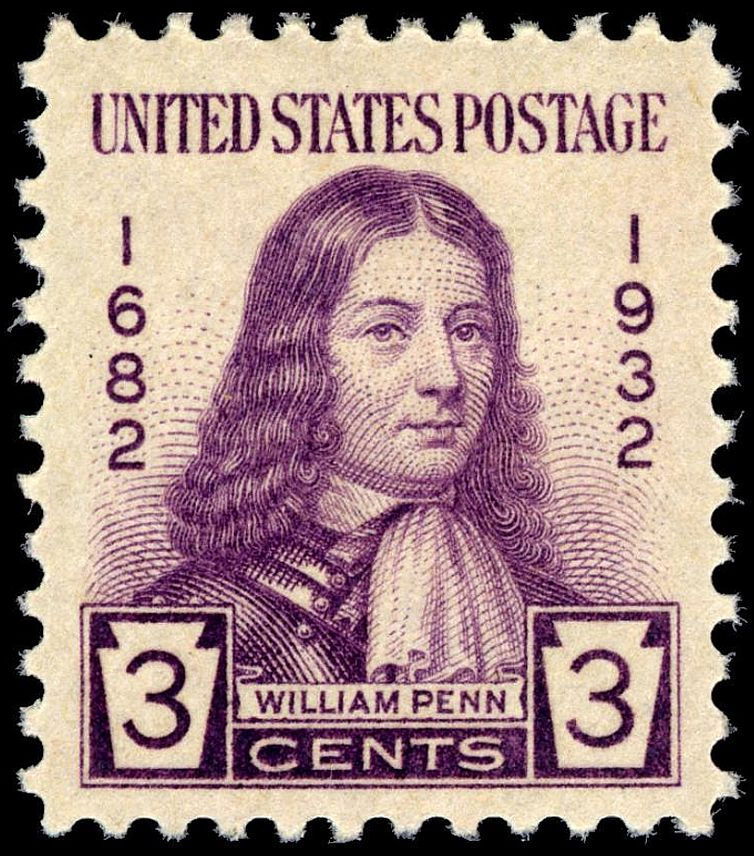
William Penn 3-cent issue of 1932

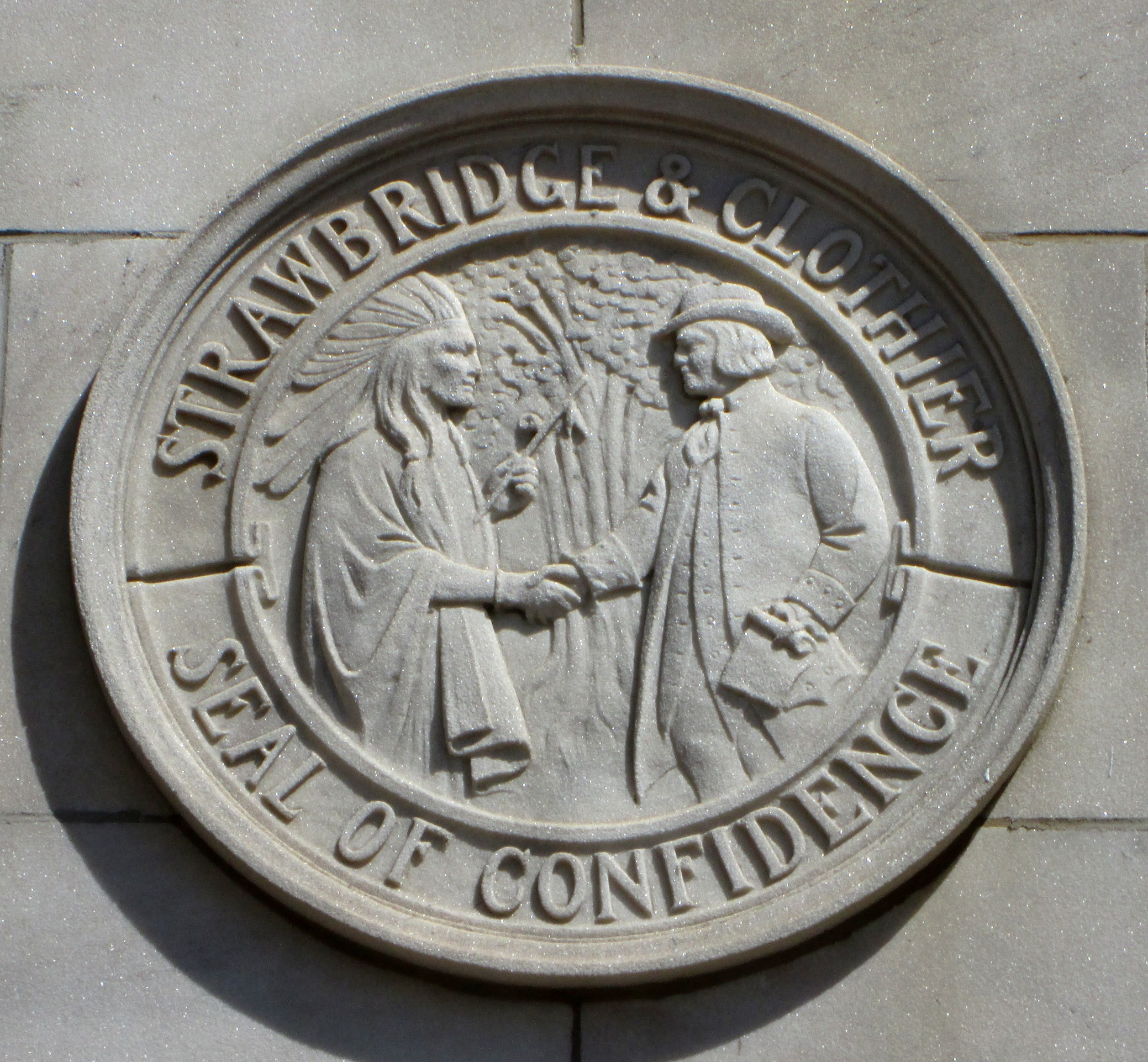
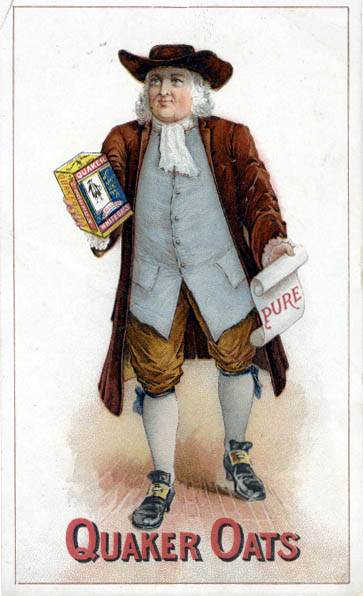
Penn on the seal of the defunct Strawbridge & Clothier department store, representing Penn's exchange with the Lenape; the Quaker Oats standing "Quaker Man" logo, identified at one time as William Penn
- On 24 October 1932, the US Post Office issued a 3-cent postage stamp to commemorate the 250th anniversary of Penn's arrival to the British-American colonies.
- On 28 November 1984, then US President Ronald Reagan issued a presidential proclamation declaring Penn and his second wife Hannah Callowhill Penn both honorary citizens of the United States.
- A bronze statue of William Penn by Alexander Milne Calder stands atop Philadelphia City Hall. When installed in 1894, the statue represented the highest point in the city, as City Hall was then the tallest building in Philadelphia. Urban designer Edmund Bacon was known to have said that no gentleman would build taller than the "brim of Billy Penn's hat". This agreement existed for almost 100 years until the city decided to allow taller skyscrapers to be built. In March 1987, the completion of One Liberty Place was the first building to do that. This resulted in a "curse" which lasted from that year on until 2008 when a small statue of William Penn was put on top of the newly built Comcast Center. The Philadelphia Phillies went on to win the 2008 World Series that year.
- A lesser-known statue of Penn is located at Penn Treaty Park, on the site where Penn entered into his treaty with the Lenape, which is famously commemorated in the painting Penn's Treaty with the Indians. In 1893, Hajoca Corporation, the nation's largest privately held wholesale distributor of plumbing, heating, and industrial supplies, adopted the statue as its trademark symbol.
- The Quaker Oats cereal brand standing "Quaker man" logo, dating back to 1877, was identified in their advertising after 1909 as William Penn, and referred to him as "standard bearer of the Quakers and of Quaker Oats". In 1946, the logo was changed into a head-and-shoulders portrait of the smiling Quaker Man. The Quaker Oats Company's website currently claims their logo is not a depiction of William Penn.
- Bil Keane created the comic Silly Philly for the Philadelphia Bulletin, a juvenile version of Penn, that ran from 1947 to 1961.
- Penn was depicted in the 1941 film Penn of Pennsylvania by Clifford Evans.
- William Penn High School for Girls was added to the National Register of Historic Places in 1986.
- The William Penn House – a Quaker hostel and seminar center – was named in honour of William Penn when it opened in 1966 to house Quakers visiting Washington, D.C. to partake in the many protests, events and social movements of the era. It has since been renamed Friends Place due to increasing discomfort with having a Quaker building named after someone who actively engaged in the slave trade.
- Chigwell School, the school he attended, has named one of their four houses after him and now owns several letters and documents in his handwriting.
- William Penn Primary School, and the successor Penn Wood Primary and Nursery School, in Manor Park, Slough, near to Stoke Park, is named after William Penn.
- A pub in Rickmansworth, where Penn lived for a time, is named the Pennsylvanian in his honour, and a picture of him is used as the pub sign.
- The Friends' School, Hobart has named one of their seven six-year classes after him.
- The William Penn Society of Whittier College has existed since 1934 as a society on the college campus of Whittier College and continues to this day.
- William Penn University in Oskaloosa, Iowa, which was founded by Quaker settlers in 1873, was named in his honour. Penn Mutual, a life insurance company established in 1847, also bears his name.
- Streets named after William Penn include William Penn Ave in Johnstown; Penn Avenue, a major arterial street in Pittsburgh and Wilkinsburg; Penn Avenue in Scranton; Penn Street in Bristol, Pennsylvania; and Pennfields in Twyford, Berkshire.

== See also ==
- Penn–Calvert boundary dispute
- Nicholas More
- Old Kennett Meetinghouse
