= Isabella (ship) =

Many ships have borne the name Isabella:

- Isabella, a British slave ship that transported slaves to Pennsylvania in 1684
- Isabella (1773 ship) was launched in 1773 in America, possibly under another name. She appeared in United Kingdom sources in 1802 and between 1802 and 1810 she made nine annual voyages as a whaler in the northern whale fishery She was last listed in 1813 with data unchanged since 1810.
- Isabella (1793 ship) was launched in France in 1791 as the East Indiaman St Jean de Lone. Two British privateers captured her in 1793. She was sold in prize and renamed Isabella. She initially sailed as a West Indiaman and then between 1795 and 1798 made two voyages to India as an "extra" ship for the British East India Company (EIC). Afterwards, she returned to the West Indies and Baltic trades and was last listed in 1809, but with data stale since c.1802.
- Isabella (1813 ship) was launched in Kingston upon Hull. She initially sailed as a transport, and then as a merchantman trading with Canada. In 1820 she underwent two maritime mishaps, only one of which was substantive. From 1824 until she wrecked in the ice in June 1835 she was a whaler in the northern whale fishery.
- Isabella (1818 ship), a 427-ton (bm) merchantman built in 1818 that made six voyages transporting convicts to Australia, and one voyage for the British East India Company
- Isabella (1823 ship), a 179-ton (bm) merchantman built in 1823 that transported a small number of convicts to Australia from Mauritius
- Isabella (1824 ship), a small ship that disappeared off the coast of Australia in 1824
- Isabella (1825 ship), was launched in 1825 at Shoreham. Initially, she traded with Gibraltar and Honduras. The Hudson's Bay Company purchased her in 1829 and she was wrecked in 1830 on the Columbia River bar.
- Isabella (1827 ship), a 323-ton (bm) merchantman built in 1827, that made one voyage transporting convicts to Australia and wrecked in 1841.
- Isabella, a schooner from Sydney that picked up survivors of the Charles Eaton from Mer Island in the Torres Strait in 1836
- PS Isabella (1877), a paddle steamer passenger vessel operated by the London and North Western Railway from 1877 to 1898
- MS Isabella, a cruise ferry built in 1989
- Isabella Watson, a ship that was wrecked in 1852. See List of shipwrecks in March 1852
- Isabella 1, current name of MS Almariya, a cruise ferry built in 1981

== See also ==
- Isabel (1850 ship), a 149-ton steamship used to search for the Franklin expedition in the Canadian Arctic
- Isabel (disambiguation)
