= History of slavery in Pennsylvania =

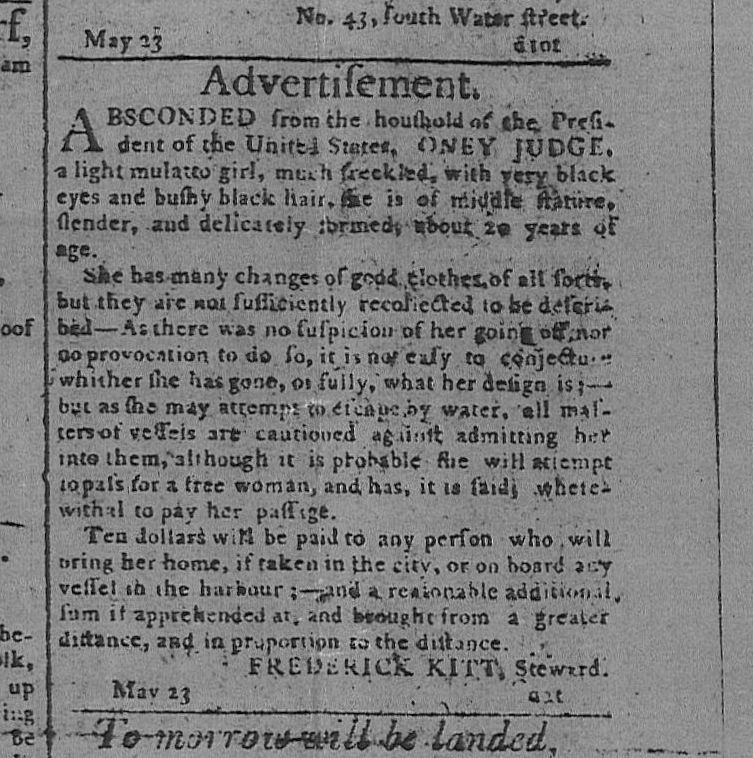
1796 Runaway advertisement for Oney Judge, a slave from George Washington's presidential household in Philadelphia

When the Dutch and Swedes established colonies in the Delaware Valley of what is now Pennsylvania, in North America, they quickly imported enslaved Africans for labor; the Dutch also transported them south from their colony of New Netherland. Enslavement was documented in this area as early as 1639. William Penn and the colonists who settled in Pennsylvania tolerated slavery. Slaves were sold from auction blocks in Philadelphia and publicly lashed at a nearby whipping post. Some English Quakers and later German immigrants were among the first to speak out against it. Many colonial Methodists and Baptists also opposed it on religious grounds. During the Great Awakening of the late 18th century, their preachers urged slaveholders to free their slaves. High British tariffs in the 18th century discouraged the importation of additional slaves, and encouraged the use of white indentured servants and free labor.

During the American Revolutionary War, Pennsylvania passed the Gradual Abolition Act (1780), the first such law in the new United States. Pennsylvania law freed those children born to enslaved mothers after that date. They had to serve lengthy indentured servitude until age 28 before becoming free as adults. Emancipation proceeded, and by 1810, fewer than 1,000 captives were in the Commonwealth. None appeared in records after 1847.

== British colony ==
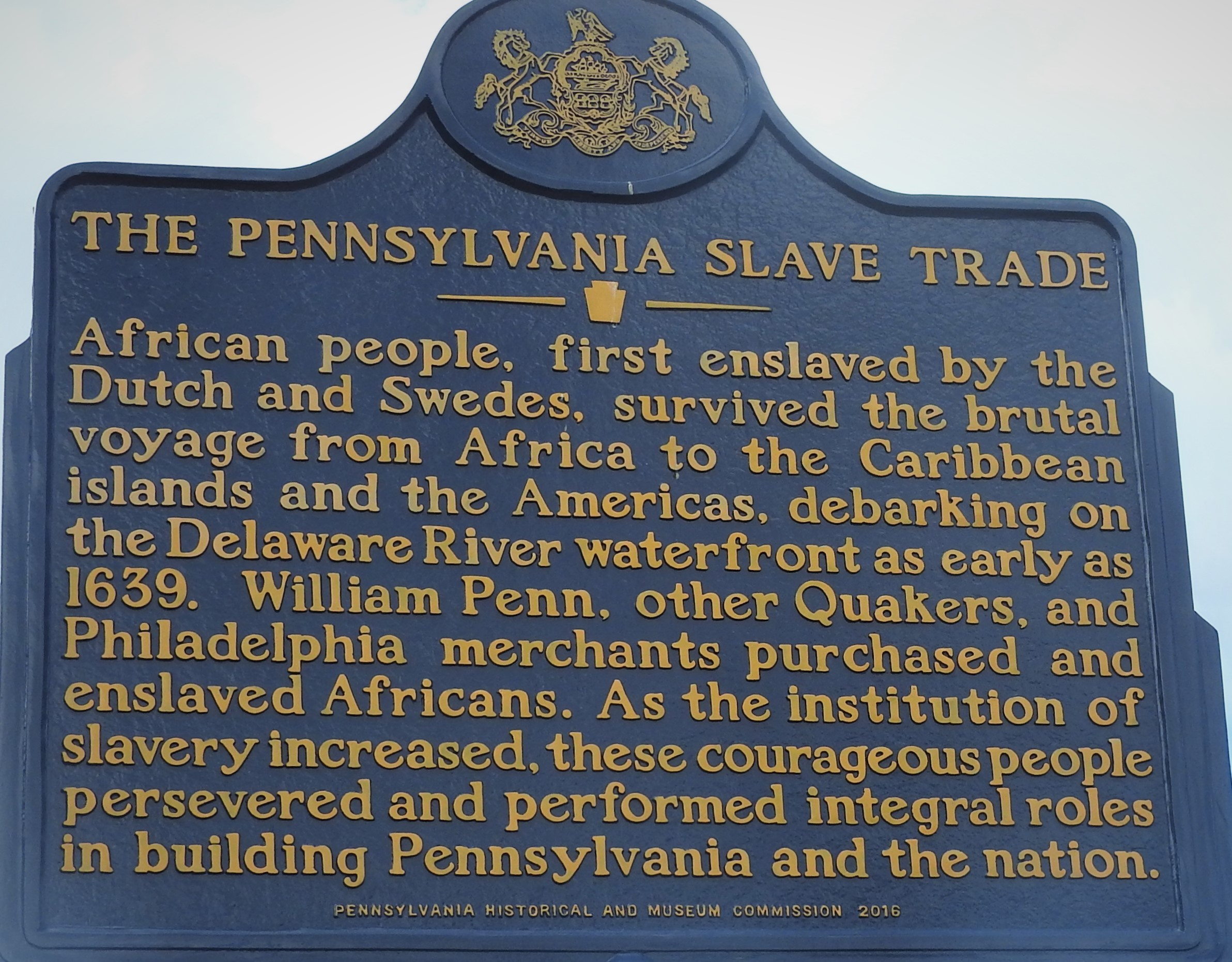
Historical marker in Philadelphia by the Delaware River

After the founding of Pennsylvania in 1682, Philadelphia became the region's main port for the import of slaves. Throughout the colony and state's history, most slaves lived in or near that city. Although most slaves were brought into the colony in small groups, in December 1684, the slave ship Isabella unloaded a cargo of 150 slaves from Africa. Accurate population figures do not exist for the early colonial period, but more demographic data is available after 1750. Estate records from 1682 to 1705 reveal that fewer than 7% of families in Philadelphia owned slaves.

The first recorded formal protest against slavery, the 1688 Germantown Quaker Petition Against Slavery, was signed by German members of a Quaker meeting. Philadelphia Quakers rejected the petition, writing, "We having inspected ye matter, above mentioned, and considered of it, we find it so weighty that we think it not expedient for us to meddle with it here." Some Pennsylvania Quakers remained slaveholders through the first half of the eighteenth century even as individual abolitionist Quakers like Benjamin Lay, John Woolman, and Anthony Benezet questioned the practice. In 1776, the Philadelphia Yearly Meeting forbade members from owning slaves. (See: Quakers in the Abolition Movement)

William Penn, the proprietor of the Province of Pennsylvania, held at least 12 slaves. They took part in the construction of the main house and outbuildings on his estate, Pennsbury. Penn left the colony in 1701, and never returned.

=== Laws ===
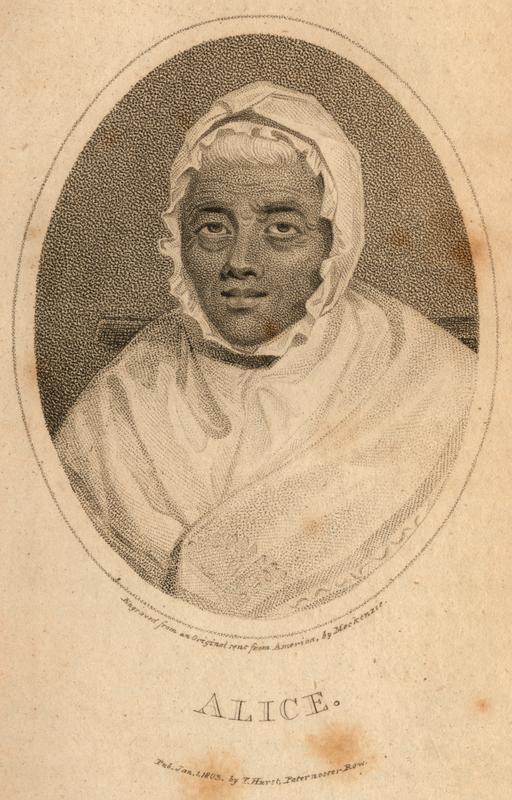
Alice of Dunk's Ferry (d. 1802), a Pennsylvania slave known as a source of oral history and for her claim to have lived to 116 years of age.

Until 1700, enslaved people came under the same laws that governed indentured servants. Beginning that year, the colony passed laws to try slaves and free blacks in non-jury courts rather than under the same terms as other residents of the colony.

Under An Act for the Better Regulating of Negroes in this Province (March 5, 1725 – 1726), numerous provisions restricted slaves and free blacks.

- (Section I) if a slave was sentenced to death, the owner would be paid full value for the slave.
- (Sec II) Duties on slaves transported from other colonies for a crime are doubled.
- (Sec III) If a slave is freed, the owner must have a sureties bond of £30 to indemnify the local government in case he/she becomes incapable of supporting himself.
- (Sec IV) A freed slave fit but unwilling to work shall be bound out [as an indentured servant] on a year-to-year basis as the magistrates see fit. And their male children may be bound out until 24 and women children until 21.
- (Sec V) Free Negroes and Mulattoes cannot entertain, barter or trade with slaves or bound servants in their homes without leave and consent of their master under penalty of fines and whipping.
- (Sec VI) If fines cannot be paid, the freeman can be bound out.
- (Sec VII) A minister, pastor, or magistrate who marries a negro to a white is fined £100.
- (Sec VIII) If a white cohabits under pretense of being married with a negro, the white will be fined 30 shillings or bound out for seven years, and the white person's children will be bound out until 31. If a free negro marries a white, they become slaves during life. If a free negro commits fornication or adultery with a white, they are bound out for 7 years. The white person shall be punished for fornication or adultery under existing law.
- (Sec IX) Slaves tippling or drinking at or near a liquor shop or out after nine, 10 lashes.
- (Sec X) If more than 10 miles from their master's home, 10 lashes.
- (Sec XI) Masters not allowed to have their slaves to find and or go to work at their own will receive a 20 shilling fine.
- (Sec XII) Harboring or concealing a slave: a 30 shillings a day fine.
- (Sec XIII) Fine to be used to pay the owners of slaves sentenced to death. This law was repealed in 1780.

During the colonial era, the Pennsylvania General Assembly passed laws that imposed duties on importing enslaved Africans to the colony, beginning in 1700. The officials of the Board of Trade rescinded the duties, which the general assembly subsequently reimposed: 1700: 20 shillings per person, 1750: 40 shillings, 1712: £20, 1715 to 1722 and again in 1725: £5: each time the Board of Trade overturned the laws, they were re-established by the general assembly.

=== Conditions ===
In the colony's first years, slaveholders forced slaves to clear land and build housing. Once the colony was established, the slaves took on various jobs. In Philadelphia, where most slaves lived, many were household servants, while others were trained in different trades and as artisans. In 1767, the wealthiest 10% of the population owned 44% of slaves; the poorest 50% of residents owned 5% of slaves. The wealthy used them as domestic servants and expressions of their wealth. Middling merchants enslaved people as servants, using some as apprentices in the business or other jobs also occupied by indentured servants. As Philadelphia was a port city, many slaves worked in jobs associated with shipping. They worked as gangs in rope-walks, and learned sailmaking. Some sailors enslaved people as workers so that the sailors could increase their share of profits, as the slaves would be given none.

In rural areas, slaves generally worked as household servants or farmhands, and sometimes both depending on need, just as farm families took on all jobs. In Southeastern Pennsylvania, iron masters who owned slaves sometimes leased them out locally to work at charcoal manufacture and the surface mining of limestone and iron ore.

Due to a lack of sanitation and understanding of disease transmission, Philadelphia was an unhealthy place during the colonial period, with a death rate of 58 per 1,000. Many slaves were among those who died early. As more males were imported than females at the time, family formation was limited. Without the continued importation of new slaves, the slave population would not have increased.

== Resistance and abolition ==
By the time of the French and Indian War, the number of slaves in the state was at its highest. More had been imported in the mid-18th century, as the improving economy in the British Isles had resulted in fewer immigrants coming as indentured servants. Given continued Anglo-European immigration to the colony, slaves as a percentage of the total population decreased over time. By the time of the American Revolution, slavery had decreased in importance as a labor source in Pennsylvania. The Quakers had long disapproved of the practice on religious grounds, as did Methodists and Baptists, active in the Great Awakening. In addition, the recent wave of German immigrants opposed it based on their religious and political beliefs. The Scots-Irish, also recent immigrants, generally settled in the backcountry on subsistence farms. As a group, they were too poor to buy slaves. In the late colonial period, people found it economically viable to pay for free labor. Another factor against slavery was the rising enthusiasm of revolutionary ideals about human rights.

Religious resistance to slavery and the slave-import taxes led the colony to ban slave imports in 1767. Slaveholders among the state's Founding Fathers included Benjamin Franklin, John Dickinson, Robert Morris, Edmund Physick and Samuel Mifflin. Franklin and Dickinson both gradually became supporters of abolition.

In 1780, Pennsylvania passed the first state Abolition Act in the United States under the leadership of George Bryan. It followed Vermont's abolition of slavery in its constitution of 1777. The Pennsylvania law ended slavery through gradual emancipation, saying:

That all Persons, as well Negroes, and Mulattos, as others, who shall be born within this State, from and after the Passing of this Act, shall not be deemed and considered as Servants for Life or Slaves; and that all Servitude for Life or Slavery of Children in Consequence of the Slavery of their Mothers, in the Case of all Children born within this State from and after the passing of this Act as aforesaid, shall be, and hereby is, utterly taken away, extinguished and for ever abolished.

This act repealed the acts of 1700 and 1726 that had established separate courts and laws specific to Negroes. At this point, state law gave slaves the same rights as bound servants. Free Negroes had, in theory, the same rights as free Whites. The law did not free those approximately 6,000 persons already enslaved in Pennsylvania. Children born to enslaved mothers had to serve as indentured servants to their mother's owner until they were 28 years old. (Such indentures could be sold.)

Pennsylvania became a state with an established African-American community. Black activists understood the importance of writing about freedom, and were essential participants in abolitionist groups. They gained access to papers run by anti-slave supporters and printed articles about freedom. Anti-slavery pamphlets and writings were rare in the South, but widely distributed in the state of Pennsylvania. African-American activists also began to hold meetings around the state, which white rioters sometimes disrupted. The activists continued to hold their meetings. African-American activists also contributed to the operations of the Underground Railroad, and aided formerly enslaved people to freedom in the state. The activists created the Vigilant Association in Philadelphia, which helped refugees from slavery to escape from enslavers and get resettled in free states.

== Decline of slavery ==
In 1780, the abolition act provided for the children of slave mothers to remain in servitude until the age of 28. Section 2 of the Act stated, "Every negro and mulatto child born within this state after the passing of this act as aforesaid who would in case this act had not been made, have been born a servant for years or life or a slave, shall be deemed to be and shall be, by virtue of this act the servant of such a person or his or her assigns who would in such case have been entitled to the service of such child until such child shall attain unto the age of twenty-eight years...". It required that they and children of African-descended indentured servants be registered at birth. Some Quarter Sessions records of Friends Meetings include births of children identified as mulatto or black.

The federal censuses reflect the decline in slavery. In addition to the effects of the state law, many Pennsylvania slaveholders freed their slaves in the first two decades after the Revolution, as did Benjamin Franklin. Revolutionary ideals and continued appeals by Quakers and Methodist clergy for the manumission of slaves inspired them. The first U.S. Census in 1790 recorded 3,737 slaves in Pennsylvania (36% of the Black population). By 1810, the Black population had more than doubled, but the percentage of slaves had dropped to 3%; only 795 slaves were listed in the state.

== End of slavery ==
Slavery was ended in Pennsylvania in 1847, except as a punishment for crime as provided by the 13th amendment of the federal constitution, by the state legislature. An Act to Prevent Kidnapping, Preserve the Public Peace, Prohibit the Exercise of Certain Powers Heretofore Exercised by Certain Judges, Justices of the Peace, Aldermen and Jailors in This Commonwealth (1847), did not recognize the property rights of slaveholders, inside or outside the state. "From the Southern point of view the conditions in the state after 1847 were such as to make imperative the passing of a new fugitive slave law to be vigorously enforced by the government of the United States." Much of the 1847 state law was superseded by the federal Fugitive Slave Act of 1850, but by then, all formerly enslaved Pennsylvanians were free.

The following table represents the growth of Pennsylvania's free black population and the decline of its enslaved population.

| Year | Free Blacks | Total Blacks | Enslaved Blacks | Percentage of Blacks free |
|---|---|---|---|---|
| 1790 | 6,537 | 10,274 | 3,737 | 63.62 |
| 1810 | 22,492 | 23,287 | 795 | 96.58 |
| 1820 | 30,202 | 30,413 | 211 | 99.31 |
| 1840 | 47,854 | 47,918 | 64 | 99.87 |
| 1860 | 56,949 | 56,949 | 0 | 100.00 |

== See also ==
- Indentured servitude in Pennsylvania
- Redemptioners
- History of Pennsylvania
- An Act for the Gradual Abolition of Slavery (1780)
- Prigg v. Pennsylvania (1842)
- History of slavery in the United States by state

== Bibliography ==
- Berlin, Ira. Generations of Captivity: A History of African-American Slaves. (2003) ISBN 0-674-01061-2
