= John Guest (judge) =

American judge

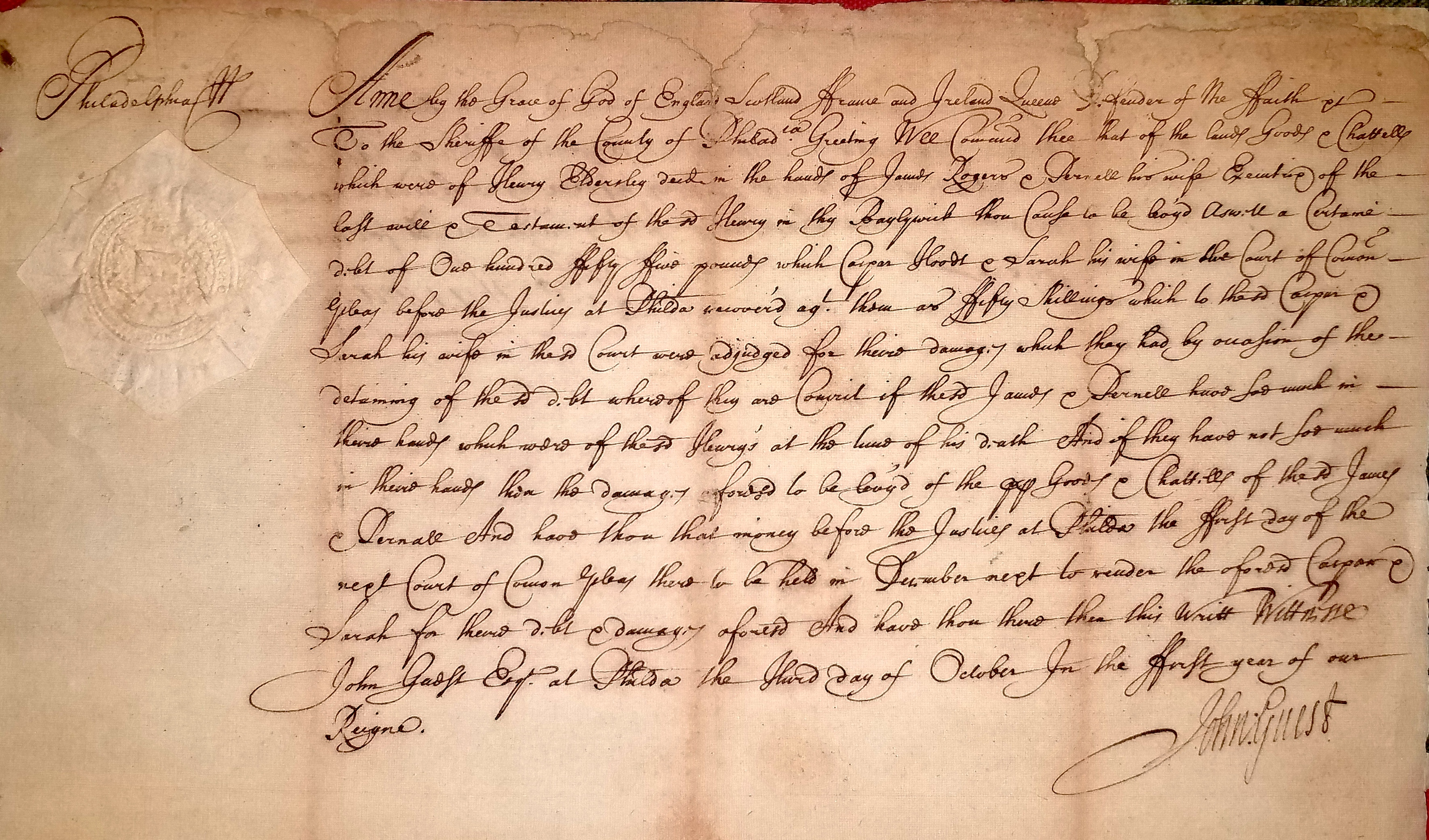
Writ of Attachment signed by Guest in 1702 as chief justice in the Province of Pennsylvania

John Guest (died 8 September 1707) was a Chief Justice of the provincial Pennsylvania Supreme Court.

Guest was born in England, where he received a university education, and probably engaged in the practice of law before coming to Pennsylvania. Shortly after his arrival in Philadelphia in 1701, he was commissioned by William Penn as chief justice of the supreme court of Pennsylvania and presiding judge of the courts of common pleas, quarter sessions, and the orphans' court of the city and county of Philadelphia. He served as chief justice in 1701, 1702, and 1705, as an associate justice in the same court in 1704, and as presiding judge of the other courts from 1701 till 1706. In July 1701, he was invited by Penn to a seat in his council, of which he remained a member until his death.
