= Holy Experiment =

Quaker community project in the U.S.

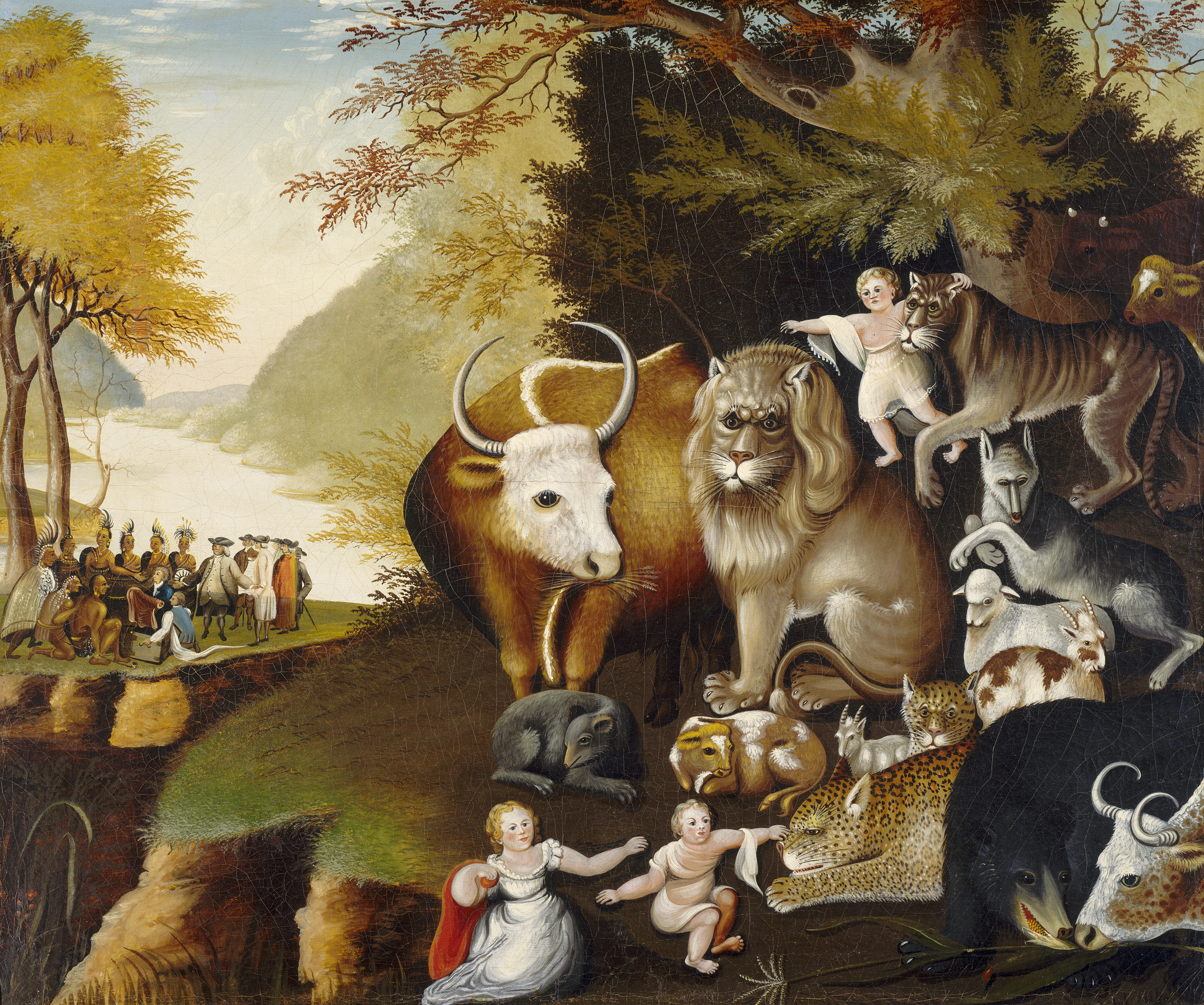
Edward Hicks, The Peaceable Kingdom (c. 1834) showing William Penn trading with Native Americans, and the lion sitting down with the lambs

The "Holy Experiment" was an attempt by the Religious Society of Friends, also known as Quakers, to establish a community for themselves and other persecuted religious minorities in what would become the modern state of Pennsylvania. They hoped it would show to the world how well they could function on their own without any persecution or dissension.

The Experiment ultimately failed due to the death of William Penn and conflicts between Quakers and non-Quakers within the colony over the foundation of a Pennsylvania-backed militia, which defied Quaker beliefs.

== History ==
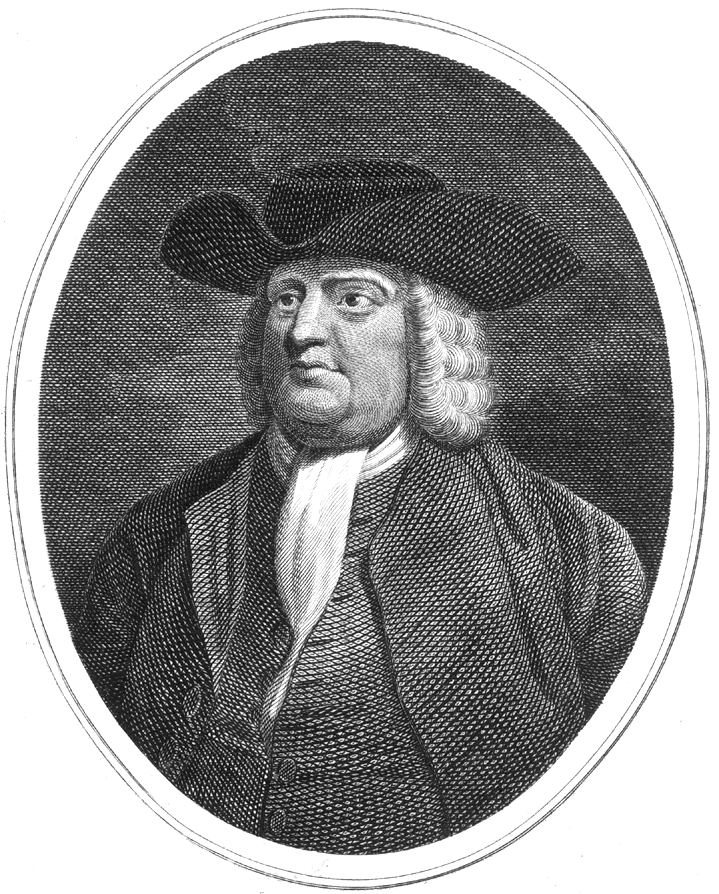
A portrait of the older William Penn

=== Foundation ===
William Penn, a son of an admiral in the Royal Navy, also William Penn, was an early convert to Quakerism, and a friend of the religion's founder, George Fox. Like many early members of the Society of Friends, Penn faced imprisonment and persecution for his beliefs, although he was spared harsh treatment in the British judicial system due to his family's stature.

Penn was also an early investor in the Americas, where he co-owned much of what would later become the state of New Jersey along with fourteen other Quaker investors. Due to his investment in New Jersey, Penn developed an interest in developing another colony in the Americas, one where Quakers and other persecuted European religious minorities could coexist. Upon his father's death, Penn had inherited a sizable debt originally owed to his father by King Charles II in exchange for several loans to the crown and years of back pay. In exchange for the negation of the debt, Charles agreed to grant Penn a large amount of land, located south of the Province of New York and north of the Province of Maryland. At 29 million acres, the land grant made Penn the largest non-monarchical land owner in the world.

After the land grant, Penn began to exert control over his colony, which he named Sylvania and King Charles named Pennsylvania (meaning "Penn's woods"), "in honour of [his] father".

He now tried to attract settlers to Pennsylvania and make a profit off his newly founded colony. Penn did a brilliant job of advertising Pennsylvania, and it quickly became the most famous colony in England and the rest of Europe alike. Penn sought to create the Holy Experiment in Pennsylvania and did so by creating a liberal frame of government, attracting all sorts of people, including many Quakers, who made up the Holy Experiment.

== Failure ==
Ultimately, tensions between the Quaker population and the growing population of non-Quakers within Pennsylvania resulted in the secularization of the province's government, and the end of the Quaker-led government. Since the colony's foundation, Pennsylvania had relied on a series of treaties with local and Northeastern Native American populations to ensure peace, as the raising of a militia would have defied Quaker peace testimony. As the Iroquois and tribes loyal to their Confederacy began to align themselves with the French, rather than the British, Pennsylvanian citizens demanded the formation of a state-backed militia to protect population centers. This tension led to the resignation and voting out of Quaker leaders, effectively ending Quaker rule of the colony, and the end of the Experiment.

== See also ==
- Province of Pennsylvania
