= Land-sale overage =

Overage or land-sale overage (also called “claw back”) is a term in land sales used to describe a sum of money in addition to the original sale price which a seller of land may be entitled to receive following completion if and when the buyer complies with agreed conditions.

Overage is often written into a contract of sale where land or property is being sold at an undervalued rate, or there is a clear process which can be undertaken to improve the value of the land over and above the cost of the process to improve the value. Obtaining planning permission is often an example of a process which can significantly enhance the value of land over and above the cost of gaining the permission, and the overage provision may state a percentage of the resultant land value increase which is due to the vendor.

Overage does not solely relate to land and property and could be written into any contract for a sale of goods. Therefore, if an old classic car in poor condition was to be sold to someone with the intent of refurbishing it and then selling it on, the original seller may choose to sell the car at a very low value and contract to receive a percentage of the uplift from the next sale as well.

In the England and Wales Court of Appeal (Civil Division), the 2008 case of Micro Design Group Ltd & Anor v BDW Trading Ltd. raised issues of whether an overage payment was due after planning permission had been obtained by the seller rather than the buyer.

Lawyer Alexandra Lethbridge notes that in other UK cases, the case law on overage is "developing fast". Examples referred to include:

- exposure of solicitors to claims of negligence for failing to include sufficient security for overage obligations in sales contracts
- use of novel remedies by the courts in order to secure justice
- the use of worked examples to follow through on the legal consequences of drafted forms of wording
- clear reference in agreements to duties of disclosure and good faith.
