= Rural land sales =

Sale of undeveloped land

In real estate, a rural land sale is a sale of undeveloped land, usually as a parcel or tract of several acres (in the U.S.) of a ranch. Such land is not usually classified as real property, since it does not contain a home, or other type of buildings.

== Application ==
In the United States, the purchase of rural land or raw acreage is generally for investment purposes, although some buyers intend to build a home and reside there. Often without standard utility services provided by a metropolitan municipality readily available, individuals have the responsibility to install methods of achieving a regulated standard of living. These methods, which include traditional and modern alternative methods are regulated by various legal structures to ensure their safety to the environment and neighboring residents. These may include:

- Drilled and dug wells, as well as groundwater
- Oil tanks and propane
- Disposal fields and septic tanks
- Wind and solar power, as well as secondary gasoline generators
- Wood fire heating

In order for a large corporation to build an establishment, they must first be approved by the rural municipality that governs the area, which often also include town hall meetings to gain the opinion and favor or local residents for the project. Most often, these projects bring with them economic benefits invaluable to struggling rural areas whose demographics are shifting and the traditional forms of income are faltering.

In certain cases, grazing rights are assigned to neighboring ranchers, so that they may continue to utilize the property for livestock grazing. Grazing rights may be appealed by land owners and upon approval must install fencing along the perimeter of the property to enclose the area.

=== Land auction ===
A method of performing real estate transactions is through auctions. Most often performed in the context of tax sales held by the municipality in the intent of paying outstanding land taxes on particular pieces of property. These are published in local newspapers, and since the emergence of the Internet, the visibility of rural land sales has been made accessible for public view. They have been popularized through auction websites, such as eBay, that host rural land auctions.

== See also ==
- Real estate investing
- Land-sale overage
- Mineral rights
- Taylor Grazing Act of 1934
- Water right
