= List of shipwrecks in March 1852 =

The list of shipwrecks in March 1852 includes ships sunk, foundered, wrecked, grounded, or otherwise lost during March 1852.

== 1 March ==
List of shipwrecks: 1 March 1852
Ship	State	Description
Eliza	United Kingdom	The ship ran aground in the Hooghly River. She was on a voyage from Trinidad to Calcutta, India.
Lahore	India	The ship ran aground in the Hooghly River. She was on a voyage from Mauritius to Calcutta.
Wanderer	United Kingdom	The ship was driven ashore 4 nautical miles (7.4 km) south of Helsingør, Denmark. She was on a voyage from Hull, Yorkshire to Danzig. She was refloated on 4 March but again drove ashore. Wanderer was refloated on 6 March and taken in to Helsingør.

== 2 March ==
List of shipwrecks: 2 March 1852
Ship	State	Description
Anastasie	France	The ship was driven ashore at Tolmo, Spain. She was on a voyage from Cannes, Alpes-Maritimes to Rouen, Seine-Inférieure.
Juno	Netherlands	The barque was wrecked on Cape Agulhas, Cape Colony with the loss of five lives. She was on a voyage from Batavia, Netherlands East Indies to Dordrecht, South Holland.
Wanderer	United Kingdom	The ship was driven ashore at Helsingør, Denmark. She was on a voyage from Hull, Yorkshire to Danzig. She was refloated the next day but drove ashore again.

== 3 March ==
List of shipwrecks: 3 March 1852
Ship	State	Description
Bank	United Kingdom	The barque ran aground on the Smithirick Sand, in the North Sea 3 to 4 nautical miles (5.6 to 7.4 km) south east of Bridlington, Yorkshire. She was on a voyage from Moulmein, Burma to Sunderland, County Durham. She was refloated and headed in a southerly direction.
Fortuna	Denmark	The schooner was severely damaged in a hurricane at Rio de Janeiro, Brazil.
Frederichsteen	(United Kingdom of Great Britain and Ireland) British North America	The ship was severely damaged in a hurricane at Rio de Janeiro.
Hebe	United Kingdom	The schooner was severely damaged in a hurricane at Rio de Janeiro.
Indus	United States	The barque was severely damaged in a hurricane at Rio de Janeiro.
Jenny	Sweden	The brig was severely damaged in a hurricane at Rio de Janeiro.
Othello	Sweden	The schooner was severely damaged in a hurricane at Rio de Janeiro.
Secundus	Belgium	The ship was driven ashore and damaged on the Tendra Spit. She was on a voyage from Odesa to a Channel port. She was refloated and found to be leaky.
Tiber	United Kingdom	The steamship ran aground at Livorno, Grand Duchy of Tuscany. She was on a voyage from Liverpool, Lancashire to Genoa, Kingdom of Sardinia and Livorno. She was refloated.
Zuleika	United Kingdom	The barque was severely damaged in a hurricane at Rio de Janeiro.

== 4 March ==
List of shipwrecks: 4 March 1852
Ship	State	Description
City of Glasgow	United Kingdom	The steamship ran aground near Newcastle, Pennsylvania, United States. She was on a voyage from Philadelphia, Pennsylvania to Liverpool, Lancashire. She was refloated and resumed her voyage.
John Hawkes	United Kingdom	The ship ran aground on the Kish Bank, in the Irish Sea and was abandoned by her eight crew, who were rescued by Ariel (United Kingdom). She was on a voyage from Liverpool, Lancashire to Waterford. She was subsequently boared by the pilot boat Alert №2 with the intention of taking her in to Kingstown, County Dublin but consequently sank with the loss of two pilots.
Lucy Ann	United Kingdom	The ship was driven ashore and wrecked on "Britton Island" with the loss of her captain. She was on a voyage from Liverpool to New Orleans, Louisiana, United States.
SMS Marianna	Austrian Navy	The paddle steamer was reported to have foundered off the mouth of the Po with the loss of all hands. Also reported to have been wrecked on the coast of Dalmatia with the loss of about 120 crew. Discovered on March 3th 2010 by capt. Andrea Falconi in the Adriatic Sea, off the river Po. The story is told in the book "Sulla Nave dell'Imperatore", Luglio Editore, Trieste, 2021, written by Andrea Falconi e Pierpaolo Zagnoni in cooperation with Nicola Falconi.
Sumpter	United Kingdom	The barque ran aground at Smithville, North Carolina, United States. She was on a voyage from Wilmington, Delaware to Liverpool.

== 5 March ==
List of shipwrecks: March 1852
Ship	State	Description
Caribbean	United Kingdom	The ship ran aground in the South Channel, off the coast of Malaya. She was on a voyage from Penang, Malaya to Singapore.
Jean de Locquenghien	France	The ship was lost off the mouth of the Lergipe, Brazil with the loss of a crew member.
Margaret	(United Kingdom of Great Britain and Ireland) British North America	The ship was driven ashore at Sandy Hook, New Jersey. She was on a voyage from Halifax, Nova Scotia to New York, United States.
Maria	United Kingdom	The schooner was driven ashore on the Isle of Skye, Outer Hebrides. She was on a voyage from Liverpool, Lancashire to Stornoway, Isle of Lewis, Outer Hebrides. She was refloated.
Natal	(United Kingdom of Great Britain and Ireland) Cape Colony	The schooner was driven ashore and wrecked in Espeigle Bay. Her crew were rescued.
Petit Martial	United Kingdom	The ship was wrecked at Point de Toulinguet, Finistère. She was on a voyage from Lannion, Côtes du Nord to Brest, Finistère.

== 6 March ==
List of shipwrecks: 6 March 1852
Ship	State	Description
Astrea, and Silurian	France; United Kingdom	Silurian was abandoned by all but her captain. She then drove into Astrea (France) and was driven ashore at Málaga, Spain. She was on a voyage from Newport, Monmouthshire to Málaga. She was refloated and found to be leaky. Astrea was abandoned by her crew, but was subsequently reboarded and taken in to Málaga. She was on a voyage from Santander to Almería, Spain
Costanza	Russia	The barque was abandoned by her crew and then driven ashore and capsized at Málaga. She subsequently became a wreck.
Favourite	France	The ship was driven ashore at Málaga. Her crew survived. She was on a voyage from Antwerp, Belgium to Barcelona, Spain. She was condemned and broken up in situ.
Laurel	United Kingdom	The paddle steamer ran aground off the Isle of Arran. She was on a voyage from Belfast, County Antrim to Glasgow, Renfrewshire. She was refloated with assistance from Mars (United Kingdom) and taken in to Greenock, Renfrewshire.
Maukin	(United Kingdom of Great Britain and Ireland) New Zealand	The brig was wrecked near North Cape, with the loss of one life.
Nicolasa	Spain	The ship was driven ashore and wrecked at Málaga, She was on a voyage from Liverpool, Lancashire, United Kingdom to Barcelona.
Nostra Señora del Carmen	Spain	The ship was abandoned by her crew then driven ashore at Málaga.
Nueve de Mayo	Spain	The ship was abandoned by her crew then driven ashore at Málaga. She was on a voyage from Santander to Barcelona. She subsequently broke up.
Ranger	United Kingdom	The ship was driven ashore near Vera, Spain. Her crew were rescued.
San Antonio	Spain	The ship was abandoned by her crew then driven ashore at Málaga.
Signet	United Kingdom	The ship was wrecked near Garrucha, Spain. Her crew were rescued.
Tuguaido	Spain	The ship was abandoned by her crew then driven ashore at Málaga. She was on a voyage from Suances to Barcelona.
Ver Huell	France	The ship capsized off Le Croisic, Loire-Inférieure. Her crew were rescued. She was on a voyage from Libourne to Nantes, Loire-Inférieure.
Waterwitch	United Kingdom	The brig ran aground at the mouth of the River Tees and was damaged. She consequently put in to Bridlington, Yorkshire in a leaky condition.

== 7 March ==
List of shipwrecks: 7 March 1852
Ship	State	Description
Aristide	France	The ship was driven ashore at Ibiza, Spain. She was on a voyage from Cette, Hérault to Algiers, Algeria.
Estrella	Spain	The ship was driven ashore at the mouth of the Palmones. Her crew were rescued.
Flora	Prussia	The ship was driven ashore near Alicante, Spain. She was refloated on 22 March and taken into Torrevieja, Spain.
Georges Auguste	France	The ship was wrecked on the Île de Bréhat, Côtes-du-Nord. Her crew were rescued. She was on a voyage from Granville, Manche to Île Saint-Pierre.
Graf von Paris	France	The ship was driven ashore at Gibraltar. She was on a voyage from Troon, Ayrshire, United Kingdom to Salonica, Greece.
Irene	Prussia	The brig was driven ashore at Gibraltar. She was on a voyage from Liverpool, Lancashire, United Kingdom to Trieste. She was refloated on 12 March and taken in to Gibraltar for repairs.
Jenny	United Kingdom	The ship was driven ashore and sank at Algeciras, Spain. She was on a voyage from Troon, Ayrshire to Constantinople, Ottoman Empire.
Lord Dupplin	United Kingdom	The ship was driven ashore in Gibraltar Bay. She was on a voyage from Port Talbot, Glamorgan to Cartagena, Spain.
Nouvelle Juliet	France	The ship was driven ashore and severely damaged east of Dénia, Spain. Her crew were rescued. She was on a voyage from Marseille, Bouches-du-Rhône to Montevideo, Uruguay. She had been refloated by 22 March.
Occidenten	Sweden	The ship was driven ashore near Alicante. She was refloated on 22 March and taken in to Torrevieja.
Sally	United Kingdom	The smack sank in the North Sea off Walton-on-the-Naze, Essex.
Thistle	United Kingdom	The paddle steamer was driven ashore near Portrush, County Antrim. She was on a voyage from Greenock to Londonderry. She was refloated and put back to Greenock in a leaky condition.

== 8 March ==
List of shipwrecks: March 1852
Ship	State	Description
Broeder Trouw, and Dragon	Netherlands; United Kingdom	The East Indiaman Broeder Trouw capsized at Hartlepool, County Durham, United Kingdom, sinking the tug Dragon.
Elizabeth	(United Kingdom of Great Britain and Ireland) British North America	The ship was wrecked near Trepassey, Nova Scotia. Her crew were rescued. She was on a voyage from Halifax, Nova Scotia to Saint John's, Newfoundland.
Esperance	France	The ship sank in the Gironde.
Jane	United Kingdom	The schooner was driven ashore at Ballina, County Mayo.
Jeune Amedée	France	The ship was holed by her anchor at Padstow, Cornwall, United Kingdom and became severely leaky. She was on a voyage from Nantes, Loire-Inférieure to Newport, Monmouthshire, United Kingdom.
Olaf	Bremen	The koff was wrecked on the Wittsand, in the North Sea. Her crew were rescued. She was on a voyage from Newcastle upon Tyne, Northumberland, United Kingdom to Bremen.

== 9 March ==
List of shipwrecks: 9 March 1852
Ship	State	Description
Active	(United Kingdom of Great Britain and Ireland) Jersey	The ship was driven ashore at Flamborough Head, Yorkshire. She was on a voyage from Guernsey, Channel Islands to Sunderland, County Durham. She was refloated and put in to Bridlington, Yorkshire in a leaky condition.
Akbar	Flag unknown	The brig was driven ashore at Vera, Spain.
Grace	United Kingdom	The schooner was driven ashore near Cemlyn, Anglesey. She was refloated on 11 March and put in to Holyhead, Anglesey.
Melvill	United Kingdom	The brig ran aground on the Nore. She was refloated and taken in to Chatham, Kent.
Olive	Duchy of Holstein	The schooner was holed by a sunken pile at Brunsbüttel, Duchy of Schleswig. She was on a voyage from La Guaira, Venezuela to the Duchy of Holstein.
Serenader	United Kingdom	The barque was driven ashore at Vera.
Stork	United Kingdom	The ship was driven ashore at Vera.
Thomas Clarke	United Kingdom	The barque was driven ashore at Vera.
Trois Cousins	France	The ship was driven ashore at Le Grau-du-Roi, Gard. Her crew were rescued. She was on a voyage from Bougie, Algeria to Marseille, Bouches-du-Rhône.
William	United Kingdom	The ship was driven ashore at Cromer, Norfolk. She was on a voyage from Sunderland, County Durham to London. She was refloated and resumed her voyage.

== 10 March ==
List of shipwrecks: 10 March 1852
Ship	State	Description
Fortuna	United Kingdom	The schooner ran aground on the Blacktail Spit, off the coast of Kent.
Golden Fleece	United States	The fishing schooner sank in a gale on the Georges Bank. Lost with all 9 crew.
Maine	United Kingdom	The ship was driven ashore at Gourdon, Aberdeenshire. She was on a voyage from Aberdeen to Newcastle upon Tyne, Northumberland.
Richmond	United Kingdom	The ship was driven ashore at Egremont, Lancashire. She was on a voyage from Buenos Aires, Argentina to Liverpool, Lancashire. She was refloated the next day and taken in to Liverpool.

== 11 March ==
List of shipwrecks: 11 March 1852
Ship	State	Description
Fanny	United States	The ship was abandoned in the Atlantic Ocean. Her crew were rescued. She was on a voyage from Liverpool, Lancashire, United Kingdom to Baltimore, Maryland.

== 12 March ==
List of shipwrecks: 12 March 1852
Ship	State	Description
Annie	United Kingdom	The ship ran aground and was damaged at Charleston, South Carolina, United States. She was on a voyage from Liverpool to Charleston. She was refloated and taken in to Charleston in a leaky condition.

== 13 March ==
List of shipwrecks: 13 March 1852
Ship	State	Description
Barlow	United Kingdom	The ship was wrecked on the coast of Puerto Rico.
Bolivar	Malta	The brig ran aground on the Malora Bank, in the Mediterranean Sea off the coast of the Grand Duchy of Tuscany. She was refloated on 22 March.
Francis Phillip	United Kingdom	The ship was driven ashore at Cape Janissary, Ottoman Empire. She was on a voyage from Galaţi, Ottoman Empire to an English port.
Mary	United Kingdom	The barque was driven ashore and wrecked near Guadalquitón, Spain. Her crew were rescued. She was on a voyage from Odesa to Antwerp, Belgium.
Rival	United Kingdom	The sloop sprang a leak and sank in the North Sea off the Dudgeon Sandbank. Her crew were rescued. She was on a voyage from Gainsborough, Lincolnshire to London.
HMS Vengeance	Royal Navy	The Canopus-class ship of the line ran aground and was damaged in Gibraltar Bay. She was on a voyage from Malta to Gibraltar. She was refloated.

== 14 March ==
List of shipwrecks: 14 March 1852
Ship	State	Description
Amphritrite	United Kingdom	The ship was in collision with a full-rigged ship or a barque and sank in the Atlantic Ocean. Her crew were rescued. She was on a voyage from Brăila, Ottoman Empire to Queenstown, County Cork.
Casimir de la Vigne	France	The ship was wrecked on Catalina Island. She was on a voyage from Saint Domingo to Havre de Grâce, Seine-Inférieure.
Colin	United Kingdom	The brigantine foundered in the Atlantic Ocean. Her crew took to a boat and were rescued the next day by Suron (Portugal). Colin was on a voyage from the "Illy" to Lisbon, Portugal.
Claudine	France	The ship was driven ashore and wrecked at Storå. Her crew were rescued.
Collina	United Kingdom	The schooner foundered in the Atlantic Ocean (45°53′N 9°15′W). Her crew were rescued the next day by the brig Tyro (United Kingdom). Collina was on a voyage from the Isles of Scilly to Lisbon, Portugal.
Glide	United Kingdom	The ship ran aground and was damaged at Poole, Dorset. She was on a voyage from Hartlepool, County Durham to Poole.
Leopold	France	The ship foundered. Her crew were rescued. She was on a voyage from Nantes, Loire-Inférieure to Bordeaux, Gironde.
Ranger	Spain	The ship was driven ashore at Veracruz, Mexico.

== 15 March ==
List of shipwrecks: 15 March 1852
Ship	State	Description
Floree	Russia	The full-rigged ship was driven ashore at Torrevieja, Spain. She had been refloated by 22 March and put in to Torrevieja.
Occidenten	Sweden	The full-rigged ship was driven ashore at Torrevieja. She had been refloated by 22 March and put in to Torrevieja.
Vrouw Gelie	Kingdom of Hanover	The ship was wrecked in the Abaco Islands. She was on a voyage from Amsterdam, North Holland, Netherlands to Darien, Georgia, United States.

== 16 March ==
List of shipwrecks: 16 March 1852
Ship	State	Description
Albert Perkins	United States	The ship departed from Boston, Massachusetts for the Cape Verde Islands. No further trace, presumed foundered in the Atlantic Ocean with the loss of all hands.
Friedrich Wilhelm IV	Prussia	The ship ran aground off Amager, Denmark. She was on a voyage from Dublin, United Kingdom to Danzig. She was refloated.
Swan	United Kingdom	The ship ran aground off Bressay, Shetland Islands. She was refloated.

== 17 March ==
List of shipwrecks: 17 March 1852
Ship	State	Description
Fanny Bourne	(United Kingdom of Great Britain and Ireland) British North America	The schooner was in collision with another vessel and capsized off Block Island, New York, United States. She was abandoned the next day. Her crew were rescued. She was on a voyage from Dartmouth, Nova Scotia to Baltimore, Maryland, United States.
Hannah	United Kingdom	The sailing barge ran aground at Dover, Kent. She was on a voyage from London to Sandgate, Kent. She was refloated.

== 18 March ==
List of shipwrecks: 18 March 1852
Ship	State	Description
Caroline	United Kingdom	The ship was abandoned in the Atlantic Ocean. Her crew were rescued. She was on a voyage from Sierra Leone to Falmouth, Cornwall.
Herald	United Kingdom	The ship ran aground on the Corton Sands, in the North Sea off the coast of Suffolk. She was on a voyage from London to Gainsborough, Lincolnshire. She was refloated.
Iris	Denmark	The steamship ran aground off Zealand. She was on a voyage from Aarhus to Copenhagen.
Seine	France	The ship was destroyed by fire in Mobile Bay. She was on a voyage from Mobile, Alabama, United States to Havre de Grâce, Seine-Inférieure.
Pike	United Kingdom	The ship ran aground on the Chichester Flats, in the English Channel off the coast of Sussex. She was on a voyage from Llanelly, Glamorgan to Littlehampton, Sussex.

== 19 March ==
List of shipwrecks: 19 March 1852
Ship	State	Description
Alma Christina	Denmark	The ship was driven ashore and wrecked at "Klitmollen". Her crew were rescued.
Ann Eliza	United Kingdom	The ship ran aground off Skagen, Denmark. She was on a voyage from Leith, Lothian to Stettin. She was refloated and taken in to Helsingør, Denmark.
Don	United Kingdom	The barque ran aground at Harwich, Essex. She was refloated.
Hannah Moore	United Kingdom	The ship was wrecked on Glover's Reef. She was on a voyage from Saint Thomas, Virgin Islands to Belize City, British Honduras.
Incertus	United Kingdom	The ship struck the Plough Seal Rock and sank off Lindisfarne, Northumberland. She was on a voyage from Sunderland, County Durham to Leith, Lothian. She was refloated the next day and towed in to Lindisfarne in a waterlogged condition.
James Ray	United Kingdom	The brig foundered in the Mediterranean Sea 50 nautical miles (93 km) north east of Mount Etna, Sicily. Her crew survived. She was on a voyage from Trieste to Liverpool, Lancashire.
Kate	United Kingdom	The ship ran aground in the Baie de Somme. She was on a voyage from Saint-Valery-sur-Somme, Somme, France to Sunderland. She was refloated the next day and resumed her voyage.
Xanthus	United Kingdom	The ship was abandoned in the Atlantic Ocean. Her crew were rescued by Chieftain (United Kingdom). Xanthus was on a voyage from Sunderland to Boston, Massachusetts, United States.

== 20 March ==
List of shipwrecks: 20 March 1852
Ship	State	Description
Independence	United States	The ship grounded on a sandbar near Cavallo Pass, Texas in Matagorda Bay. During the attempt to rescue passengers, a lifeboat sank leading to the deaths of seven.
Industrie	Rostock	The ship was wrecked on Skagen, Denmark. She was on a voyage from Bo'ness, Lothian, United Kingdom to Copenhagen, Denmark.
Joseph Green	United Kingdom	The whaler was holed by ice, capsized and sank off the coast of Greenland with the loss of four of her 60 crew. Survivors were rescued by Maginthian (United Kingdom).
Reynard	United Kingdom	The schooner capsized in the Irish Sea. Her crew were rescued. She was on a voyage from Nantes, Loire-Inférieure to Belfast, County Antrim. She was towed in to Donaghadee, County Antrim by the smacks Pearl and Pearl (both United Kingdom) and righted.

== 21 March ==
List of shipwrecks: 21 March 1852
Ship	State	Description
Isabella Watson	United Kingdom	The ship was wrecked at Port Phillip Heads, South Australia with the loss of nine lives. She was on a voyage from Liverpool, Lancashire to Port Phillip.
Union	Bremen	A message in a bottle washed up on Sylt, Duchy of Holstein on 24 May stating that the ship had been wrecked off the English coast on this date. She was on a voyage from Bremen to New York, United States.

== 22 March ==
List of shipwrecks: 22 March 1852
Ship	State	Description
Amy	United Kingdom	The brig was driven ashore and wrecked at the Seven Heads, County Cork with the loss of fifteen of her eighteen crew. Survivors were rescued by the Coast Guard. She was on a voyage from Belize City, British Honduras to Cork.
Anne's Resolution	United Kingdom	The brig was driven ashore and wrecked at South Shields, County Durham.
Brithia	Kingdom of Sardinia	The barque was wrecked on a reef 15 nautical miles (28 km) north of Pernambuco, Brazil. She was on a voyage from Genoa to the River Plate.
Clio	United Kingdom	The ship ran aground on the Huna Rocks, in the Orkney Islands. She was on a voyage from Newcastle upon Tyne, Northumberland to Dublin. She was refloated and put in to Stromness, Orkney Islands in a leaky condition.
Dice	Kingdom of Hanover	The schooner was driven ashore and wrecked at Chipiona, Spain. Her crew were rescued.
Hesse Cassel	Electorate of Hesse	The ship was in collision with Orontes (United Kingdom and foundered in the Atlantic Ocean off Cape St. Mary's, Portugal with the loss of a crew member. She was on a voyage from Liverpool, Lancashire, United Kingdom to Corfu, United States of the Ionian Islands.
Lord Ashley	United Kingdom	The ship was wrecked at Havana, Cuba. She was on a voyage from New Orleans, Louisiana, United States to Liverpool, Lancashire.
Sophia	Russia	The schooner was wrecked near Lagos, Portugal. Her crew were rescued. She was on a voyage from Málaga, Spain to Saint Petersburg.
Wrights	United Kingdom	The ship ran aground at Constantinople, Ottoman Empire. She was on a voyage from Odesa to Falmouth, Cornwall or Queenstown, County Cork. She was refloated on 24 March and taken in to Constantinople.

== 23 March ==
List of shipwrecks: 23 March 1852
Ship	State	Description
Bakel	France	The full-rigged ship collided with New Margaret (United Kingdom and sank in the Atlantic Ocean. Her crew were rescued by New Margaret. Bakel was on a voyage from Senegal to Havre de Grâce, Seine-Inférieure.
Emma	United Kingdom	The full-rigged ship was wrecked near Dunworley, County Cork with the loss of fifteen of her eighteen crew. She was on a voyage from British Honduras to Queenstown, County Cork.
Favourite	(United Kingdom of Great Britain and Ireland) Victoria	The barque was driven ashore at Swan Point.
Hoffnung	Kingdom of Hanover	The galiot foundered in the North Sea 12 nautical miles (22 km) off the coast of County Durham, United Kingdom. Her crew were rescued. She was on a voyage from Sunderland, County Durham to Hamburg.
Honour	United Kingdom	The ship was wrecked on Saint Domingo.
Rosalie	United Kingdom	The ship ran aground at Montevideo, Uruguay. She was refloated with assistance from HMS Locust (Royal Navy) and taken in to Montevideo.
Theocleben	France	The ship was driven ashore in Ringabella Bay, County Cork, United Kingdom. She was on a voyage from Queenstown, County Cork to Belfast, County Antrim, United Kingdom. She was refloated and put back to Queenstown in a leaky condition.
Victoria	United Kingdom	The ship sank in the Atlantic Ocean. Her crew were rescued. She was on a voyage from Cardiff, Glamorgan to Wilmington, Delaware, United States.

== 24 March ==
List of shipwrecks: 24 March 1852
Ship	State	Description
Catherine	United Kingdom	The ship was wrecked on the Splangh Rock, off the coast of County Wexford. She was on a voyage from Liverpool, Lancashire to Montreal, Province of Canada, British North America.
John Clark	(United Kingdom of Great Britain and Ireland) British North America	The schooner was destroyed by fire at Mobile, Alabama, United States.

== 25 March ==
List of shipwrecks: 25 March 1852
Ship	State	Description
Caroline	Prussia	The ship was driven ashore at Jershöft. Her crew were rescued. She was on a voyage from Swinemünde to Pillau.
Catherine	United Kingdom	The full-rigged ship was driven ashore and wrecked at Greenore Point, County Dublin. she was on a voyage from Liverpool, Lancashire to Montreal, Province of Canada, British North America.
Ceres	Rostock	The ship was wrecked on the Fischlande, off Wustrow, Prussia. Her crew survived. She was on a voyage from Stettin to Rostock.

== 26 March ==
List of shipwrecks: 26 March 1852
Ship	State	Description
Abbey	United Kingdom	The schooner was destroyed by fire at Mostyn, Flintshire.
Independence	United States	The steamboat was wrecked in Matagorda Bay with the loss of seven lives.
Pocohontas	United States	The steamboat suffered a boiler explosion near Memohism Tennessee. Eight people were killed, eighteen were seriously injured.
Robert Stanfield	United Kingdom	The ship was in collision with another vessel and sank off Norderney, Kingdom of Hanover. All on board were rescued by Vrouw Alida (Netherlands). Robert Stanfield was on a voyage from Malta to Bremen.

== 27 March ==
List of shipwrecks: 27 March 1852
Ship	State	Description
Active	(United Kingdom of Great Britain and Ireland) Jersey	The cutter struck a sunken rock and sank off Jersey. She was on a voyage from Sunderland, County Durham to Jersey.
City of Lincoln	United States	The ship ran aground at the mouth of the Mississippi River. She was on a voyage from New Orleans, Louisiana to Liverpool, Lancashire, United Kingdom.
Gesina	Kingdom of Hanover	The ship ran aground at Queenstown, County Cork, United Kingdom.

== 28 March ==
List of shipwrecks: 28 March 1852
Ship	State	Description
Aliwal	United States	The ship was abandoned in the Atlantic Ocean. Her crew were rescued. She was on a voyage from Baltimore, Maryland to Liverpool, Lancashire, United Kingdom.
Ann	United Kingdom	The flat was severely damaged by fire at Pwllheli, Caernarfonshire.
William and Mary	United Kingdom	The sloop was driven ashore and damaged at Drogheda, County Louth. She was on a voyage from Milford Haven, Pembrokeshire to Drogheda. She was refloated and taken in to Drogheda in a leaky condition.

== 29 March ==
List of shipwrecks: 29 March 1852
Ship	State	Description
Jens Ruffen	Norway	The ship ran aground on Scroby Sands, Norfolk, United Kingdom. She was on a voyage from Christiansand to Fécamp, Seine-Inférieure. She was refloated the next day and taken in to Great Yarmouth, Norfolk in a waterlogged condition.
Louise	France	The ship was wrecked on "Bajos de Levandoros". Her crew were rescued. She was on a voyage from Granville, Manche to Havana, Cuba.
Porto	Portugal	The steamship was wrecked at the mouth of the Douro with the loss of 57 lives. Eight crew survived. She was on a voyage from Porto to Lisbon.

== 30 March ==
List of shipwrecks: 30 March 1852
Ship	State	Description
Charlotte	United Kingdom	The ship was wrecked on the Green Turtle Keys. She was on a voyage from Apalachicola, Florida, United States to Liverpool, Lancashire.
Danube	Trieste	The ship was driven ashore near Messina, Sicily. She was on a voyage from Mobile, Alabama, United States to Trieste. She was refloated and taken in to Messina.
Lydia	United Kingdom	The schooner was driven ashore at Great Yarmouth, Norfolk. She was on a voyage from Dundee, Forfarshire to London. Lydia was refloated the next day.
Sisters	United Kingdom	The sloop was driven ashore derelict and crewless at Marloes, Pembrokeshire.

== 31 March ==
List of shipwrecks: 31 March 1852
Ship	State	Description
HMS Antelope	Royal Navy	The Antelope-class sloop ran aground off Portsmouth, Hampshire. She was refloated and taken in to Portsmouth.
Lark	United Kingdom	The ship ran aground and was damaged at Poole, Dorset. She was on a voyage from Cowes, Isle of Wight to Poole. She was refloated and taken in to Poole in a leaky condition.
Lark	United Kingdom	The ship caught fire and foundered in the Irish Sea 9 nautical miles (17 km) north west of Portpatrick, Wigtownshire. She was on a voyage from Larne, County Antrim to Greenock, Renfrewshire.
Sobraon	United Kingdom	The ship was driven ashore at Red Wharf Bay, Anglesey. She was on a voyage from Liverpool, Lancashire to Callao, Peru. She was refloated and resumed her voyage.
Thetis	Hamburg	The brigantine was driven ashore at Sidi Daoun, Algeria.

== Unknown date ==
List of shipwrecks: Unknown date in March 1852
Ship	State	Description
Bathurst	United Kingdom	The barque was wrecked in the Bay of Honduras with the loss of all hands.
Bertha	Hamburg	The barque was lost 17 nautical miles (31 km) north east by east of Gorgona Island, Grand Duchy of Tuscany with the loss of a crew member.
Canton	Denmark	The full-rigged ship was wrecked on the Cornwallis Reef. Her crew were rescued. She was on a voyage from Valparaíso, Chile to China.
Catharina	Netherlands	The full-rigged ship ran aground in the "Straits of Loepodie" before 27 March. She was refloated and taken in to Surabaya, Netherlands East Indies in a leaky condition.
C. E. Parkhurst	United States	The fishing schooner was lost on the Georges Bank. Lost with all 8 hands.
Courrier des Landes	France	The ship ran aground on the Traverse. She was on a voyage from Bordeaux, Gironde to Rouen, Seine-Inférieure. She was subsequently refloated and towed in to Abbeville, Somme.
Courser	United Kingdom	The ship was driven ashore at Barletta, Kingdom of the Two Sicilies. She was on a voyage from Barletta to Gloucester. She was refloated and resumed her voyage, but consequently put in to Malta in a leaky condition on 5 April.
Eleazar	France	The ship was wrecked. She was on a voyage from Jaffa, Ottoman Syria to Marseille, Bouches-du-Rhône.
Emily Allison	United States	The ship was driven ashore on Hart's Island, New York before 7 March. She was refloated and resumed her voyage.
Eugenia	Chile	The ship was lost near Maule before 25 March. Her crew were rescued.
Eugénie	United Kingdom	The ship was wrecked near Dénia, Spain. She was on a voyage from Cette, Hérault to Saint-Valery-sur-Somme, Somme.
F. Henricecho	Spain	The ship was wrecked off the coast of British Honduras.
Général Burgeaud	France	The ship was lost near Palma de Mallorca, Spain before 10 March. She was on a voyage from Algiers, Algeria to Cette.
Gipsy	United Kingdom	The ship was driven ashore at São José da Coroa Grande, Brazil. She was refloated and taken in to Maranhão, Brazil, where she arrived on 18 March in a leaky condition. She was abandoned as unrepairable.
Golden Fleece	United States	The fishing schooner was lost on the Georges Bank. Lost with all 9 hands.
Iris	United Kingdom	The ship ran aground on the Shipwash Sand, in the North Sea off the coast of Essex. She was on a voyage from Sunderland, County Durham to Bermuda. She was refloated but consequently put in to Plymouth, Devon, where she arrived on 10 March.
John Bull	United Kingdom	The ship was abandoned in the Atlantic Ocean. Her crew were rescued by Commerce (United Kingdom). John Bull was on a voyage from Liverpool to Savannah, Georgia, United States.
Lydia	United Kingdom	The schooner was driven ashore and damaged at Great Yarmouth, Norfolk. She was refloated on 31 March and taken in to Great Yarmouth.
Marguerite	France	The ship was lost before 18 March. She was on a voyage from Marseille to Antwerp, Belgium.
Mercur	Norway	The ship was driven ashore on Laaland, Denmark. She was on a voyage from Flensburg, Duchy of Holstein to an English port. She was refloated and taken in to Nakskov in a damaged condition.
Milton	United Kingdom	The ship was wrecked off the coast of British Honduras.
Numa	France	The ship was wrecked in the Canary Islands before 28 March. Her crew were rescued. She was on a voyage from an English port to Rio de Janeiro, Brazil.
Nyverheid	Netherlands	The ship foundered off "Pentret Island". Her crew were rescued. She was on a voyage from Amsterdam, North Holland to Bayonne, Loire Atlantique, France.
Perseus	United Kingdom	The barque was destroyed by fire off Socotra before 24 March. Her crew were rescued.
Ruth Eliza	(United Kingdom of Great Britain and Ireland) British North America	The brig was wrecked on Cape Chignecto, Nova Scotia before 4 March. She was on a voyage from Yarmouth, Nova Scotia to Saint John, New Brunswick.
Sabrina	United Kingdom	The ship was lost off the coast of British Honduras.
Siranie Denise	France	The ship was wrecked near Dénia. Her crew were rescued. She was on a voyage from Algiers to Cette.
Tech	France	The ship foundered. Her crew were rescued. She was on a voyage from Saint-Brieuc, Côtes-du-Nord to Bordeaux.
Themis	France	The ship was driven ashore near Boulogne, Pas-de-Calais, France. She was on a voyage from Adra, Spain to Dunkirk, Nord. She was refloated on 9 March and taken in to Boulogne.
Theodor	Flag unknown	The ship ran aground and sank off "Lickraggen" before 2 March. She was on a voyage from Lübeck or Liebau, Prussia to Riga, Russia.
Toch	France	The ship foundered. She was on a voyage from Saint-Brieuc, Côtes-du-Nord to Bordeaux, Gironde.
Winchester	United Kingdom	The ship ran aground at New Orleans, Louisiana, United States in mid-March. She was on a voyage from New Orleans to Liverpool.
Xavier	France	The brig was wrecked at Cape St. Antonio, Portugal before 15 March. Her crew were rescued.
