= Isabella (slave ship) =

Isabella was an English slave ship operating out of Bristol which brought 150 African slaves to Philadelphia, Pennsylvania in 1684. The majority of these slaves were purchased directly by local Quaker settlers, who themselves had only arrived three years earlier to city. This marked a major chapter of the history of slavery in Pennsylvania. More slave ships arriving in Philadelphia would result in approximately 2,500 Black people living in the city by 1720.

== See also ==
- Quakers in the Abolition Movement: Even though many Quakers strongly opposed slavery, some Quaker families were slaveholders.
