= Isabella (1824 ship) =

Isabella was a ship that disappeared off the coast of Australia in 1824.

Isabella was anchored off the bar at Port Macquarie, New South Wales, when the pilot boarded the ship and ordered his crew to return at 2 pm to pick him up after crossing the bar. At 2 pm his crew returned but instead of taking the pilot on board, boarded the ship, seized her crew, and headed out to sea with the ship. About 4 miles (6.4 km) off shore, the mutineers cast the pilot and the ship's crew adrift.

Isabella was never heard from again; it is assumed she foundered. The ship was owned by Richard Kelly, who had purchased it on favourable terms as compensation for the loss of his schooner Black Jack through the negligence in 1823 of the pilot at Port Macquarie. Both Isabella and Black Jack had been on government service at the time of their loss.

Richard Kelly received compensation in 1833 from Governor Darling in the form of some 1,920 acres (7.8 km^{2}) of land in the Parish of Scoone, Brisbane. This occurred despite a previous order that because Richard Kelly had been caught bribing a storekeeper in 1822 he was never to receive any indulgence in the power of the Crown...
