= Province of Pennsylvania =

British colony in North America (1681–1776)

Coordinates: 40.296°N 75.509°W

- 1681–1776
- Ensign Coat of arms

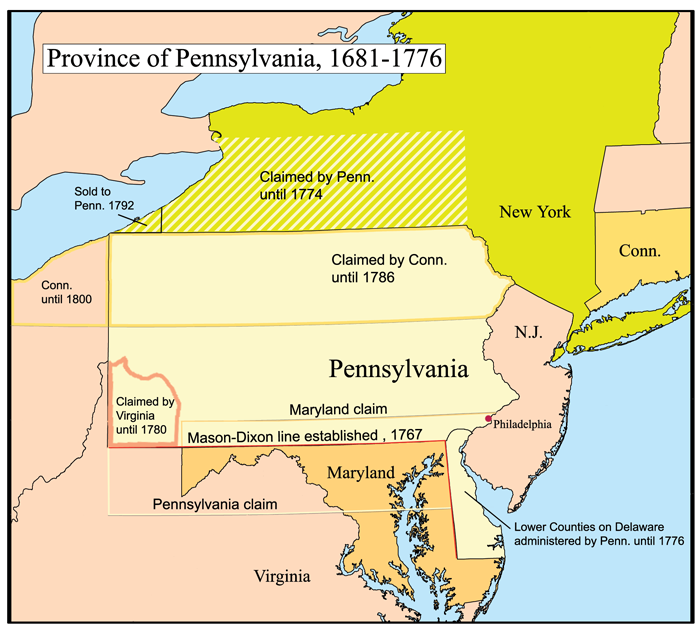
- Map of the Province of Pennsylvania

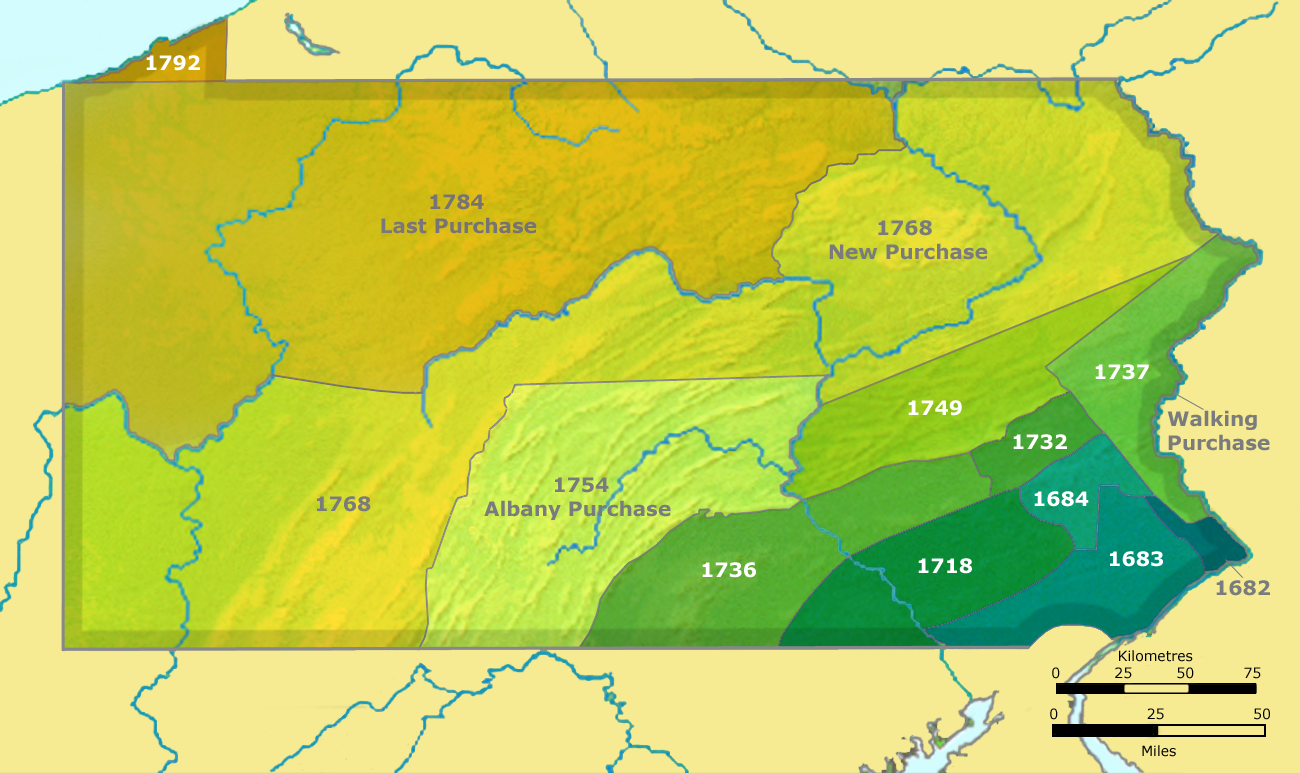
- Land purchases from Native Americans in Pennsylvania
- Status: Colony of England (1681–1707); Colony of Great Britain (1707–1776)
- Capital: Philadelphia
- Official languages: English and Pennsylvania Dutch
- Government: Proprietary colony
- Proprietor
  - 1681–1718: William Penn (first)
  - 1775–1776: John Penn (last)
- Governor
  - 1681–1682: William Markham (first)
  - 1773–1776: John Penn (last)
- Legislature: (1683–1776); Provincial Assembly (1776); Provincial Conference
  - Upper house: Provincial Council
  - Lower house: General Assembly
- History
  - Land grant by Charles II of England to William Penn: March 4, 1681
  - Declaration of Independence: July 4, 1776

Population
  - 1770 estimate: 240,057
- Currency: Pennsylvania pound
Preceded by	Succeeded by
New Netherland	Commonwealth of Pennsylvania; Delaware
- Today part of: United States

The Province of Pennsylvania, also known as the Pennsylvania Colony, was a British colony situated on the Mid-Atlantic seaboard of North America. The colony was founded for religious thinker William Penn, who received the land through a 1681 grant from Charles II of England. The name Pensiylvania (later standardized to Pennsylvania) is derived from Latin, meaning "Penn's Woods," a reference to William's father, Admiral Sir William Penn, rewarded for his wartime service in Jamaica and the Dutch Republic.

Pennsylvania received its charter in 1681 for the stated purpose of "enlarging our English Empire" and "reducing the savage Natives by gentle and just manners to the Love of Civil Societie and Christian Religion". It bestowed Penn a great deal of freedom regarding its administration; It encouraged lawful immigration and furnished settlers liberal property rights, free trade with the indigenous population and "good and happy government"–at the judgement of the crown which was to review the colony's laws on a 5 year basis.

The Penns were well-known and wealthy members of the landed gentry and frequent creditors to the English royal family. William's father alone was owed £16,000 by the English king for wartime bonds. (Note: An amount equivalent to £4,000,000 as of 2026.) The younger Penn condition that he pay "free and comon Socage, by fealty only for all Services" in the form of annual payments of two beaver skins and a 1/5th return of all gold and silver ore found there. He intended for it to be a "Holy experiment" with the guidance of the Christian Society of Friends (Quakers). Pennsylvania's colonial history begun with several small settlements along the Delaware river, and by the American revolution in 1776, its borders extended across the Appalachian mountains.

Before European colonization, the Delaware and Susquehanna valleys were inhabited by several peoples, including the Lenape and Susquehannock. Competition among European powers and economic incentives, such as the new lucrative fur trade, attracted migrants. Upland, on the lower reaches of the Delaware, was founded by Swedish colonists in 1644 as a tobacco plantation within New Sweden before its eventual fall to Dutch forces and annexation to New Netherland. On the English conquest of New Netherland that followed, in 1682, it was incorporated as Chester, the first town in the fledging Pennsylvania colony. Shortly upstream, Philadelphia, the colony's capital, was founded. That same year, the slave ship Isabella brought the first 150 black people to Philadelphia, and by 1760, the city had grown to become the largest in British North America, with over 20,000 inhabitants. (Note: The second largest city in North America, second to Mexico City, which had 50,000+ inhabitants.) Throughout the next century, Pennsylvania's population boomed–growing from 680 to 11,450 in its first decade. Colonists settled up the Delaware valley and inland. In the same decade, the Treaty of Fort Stanwix was concluded and Fort Pitt, the first English speaking trans-Appalachian settlement was founded, later becoming the city of Pittsburgh.

Culminating in Fort Stanwix, the colonial government negotiated a series of purchases from indigenous leaders, expanding the colony westward to accommodate the new migrants. William Penn's so-called "Treaty of Friendship" established amicable relations between the colonists and the Lenape. While William was reputedly fair with the natives in his dealings, his heirs were not. His son's Walking Purchase, which annexed the colony 1,200,932 acres, is largely accepted to be fraudulent. This would enrage the Lenape, leading to Penn's Creek massacre.

The royal charter's geographical errors led to prolonged conflict with other colonies. When the Province of New York was chartered in 1691, both colonies disputed ownership of the 43rd parallel north. The border was later fixed to the 42nd parallel north, where it stands today. Simultaneously, a long feud between the Calvert proprietors of the Province of Maryland and the Penn family over competing land claims was brewing. A 1767 survey largely resolved this and demarcated the Mason–Dixon line. Further strife in the Delmarva peninsula led to Delaware becoming de facto independent of Pennsylvania–though still de jure under the authority of the royal governor.

Besides the royal charter, constitutional documents include the 1701 Charter of Privileges and the Frame of Government of Pennsylvania. Penn's Frame of Government in particular granted a series of rights to the settlers of his colony, most notably, the freedom of worship, totally unique in that era. Pennsylvania's religious pluralism attracted many diverse and often ostracized religious groups, namely the Jews, Amish, Welsh Quakers and the predominantly Mennonite Pennsylvania Germans. The culture of both colonial and modern Pennsylvania is shaped by these groups.

== History ==
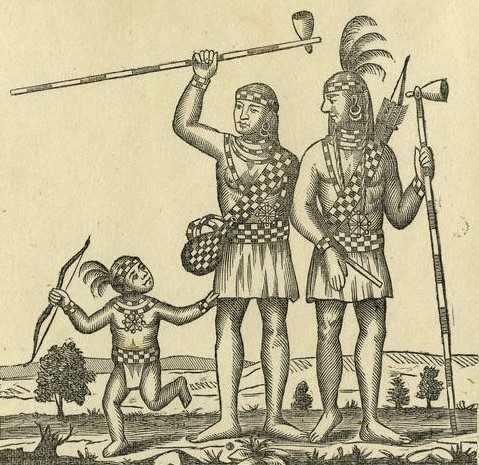
Print by Thomas Campanius Holm depicting Lenni Lenape ("Original People"). Published in Stockholm, Sweden, in 1702.

It remains a question of history as to which European first explored what is now Pennsylvania. Dutch trappers may have come in the early seventeenth century. Henry Hudson, an Englishman in service of the Dutch Republic, noted the existence of what is now Delaware bay in a 1606 voyage, which established competing English and Dutch claims to the region decades down the line.

The Dutch named what is now the Delaware River (known locally as Lenapewihittuck) the Zuydt (South) river, incorporated it into the colony of New Netherlands as a counterpart to the Nord (now Hudson) River. The English in 1610 laid their claim, naming the river and eponymous bay for Lord De la Warr. As the valley displayed no apparent wealth, Europeans lost interest and made no move to settle it. That changed when the Beversreede, or Beaver trade route, connecting the Susquehanna River, near Conestoga, to the Schuylkill River was discovered in the 1620s. In 1623, the Dutch moved up as far as the Schuylkill (Hidden) River and established small trading posts and a fort adjacent to the river. They negotiated with the Nanticoke people for rights to the Delaware Bay to some success. Their complexes were soon critically understaffed and abandoned, however. The first attempt at colonization of the Delaware basin was the short-lived Zwaanendael Colony in modern day Delaware state.

=== New Sweden and New Netherlands ===
Map of colonial North America showing New-Nederland and New-Sweden, c. 1650

Samuel Blommaert, a Dutch Speculator, encouraged the incorporation of a Swedish trading company as a bulwark against Roman Catholic influence in the Americas, a key to wealth, and a base for the propagation of Lutheranism to the "wild nations". He had no doubt heard recent tales of Spanish adventurers returning to Europe from the Americas with ships full of gold. The Swedish South Company was unveiled in 1626, quickly amassing confidence and large sums from investors, enough that the company could afford to land its first party at what is now Swedes' Landing. Founded a year later was the Swedish Africa Company. Sweden's new great power status allowed it to finance colonial expeditions abroad. The colonists were dismayed to find no gold, but nonetheless collected beaver pelts, tobacco and silkworms. Other industries also included winemaking and timbery. Agriculture was also established, with wheat and rye being the chief crop planted on cleared forestland purchased from the natives.

In contrast to New England, New Sweden was an enterprise primarily intended to satisfy its shareholders rather than establish a permanent self-sufficient colony in North America. The scarcity of women and capricious nature of the continent made family life and permanent settlement a practical impossibility. Year by year several colonists returned to Sweden or fled to New England. Convicts were regularly sent by the Swedish crown to fill the gaps created by remigration. The population of New Sweden rarely exceeded 200–400, peaking at 500-600 at its fall, with around half of the population being of Finnish heritage.

Dutch governor Peter Minuit wielded diplomatic skill to negotiate a treaty with 5 Lenape chiefs on April 8, 1638. According to the colonists, they had won rights to 67 miles of land along the Delaware river adjacent to Fort Christina and setting west as "far as the setting sun". They settled both banks of the river and the eponymous bay, creating a network of forts, churches and commercial centers. The hallmark of Swedish colonization was the wooden logcabin.

The first recorded epidemic in the Delaware Valley is spoken of in 1642 when a "great sickness" spread among the colonists. 15 of the 135 inhabitants of New Sweden are recorded to have died the following year; the native death toll is unknown but is thought to be exceedingly high. Typhus spread via body lice and scurvy from ships docking at the ports. Both reaped the colony's population for several decades. The Lenape intended to dispatch folk healers to cast the "spirit" away, but the Swedes refused their efforts for religious reasons. Most telling of the extent of the sickness among the natives is that European textbooks frequently noted, and could differentiate with ease, the Lenape phrases n'mechquin, ("I have a cough") n'daptessi, ("I sweat") and n'matamalsi ("I am sick") as essential terms.

Relations between the two nations were largely warm, Governor Johan Printz was on order from Stockholm to treat the Lenape cordially. Deliberation and restraint was a practical necessity for New Sweden, possessing fewer then 110 men-at-arms, and only a handful being fit for service. New Sweden eventually grew to pose a threat to Dutch trade dominance in North America, and its weakness became apparent to Dutch. When war broke out between them in 1654, the Swedes surrendered largely without a fight. The capture of two key positions, Fort Trinity (later Casmir) and Fort Christina solidified the fate of New Sweden. It is reported that Hendrick Von Elswick, the Swedish director at Fort Trinity told Dutch officer Peter Stuyvesant "Hodie mihi, cras tibi" (Today me, tomorrow you).

Dutch rule was warm to the established Swedish population, allowing them to retain their customs, officers and legal system. Immigration continued at a steadfast flow under Dutch and later English rule. New Sweden left a salient mark on the culture of the Delaware Valley, even so long after its fall, with Swedish and Finnish being recorded as the dominant tongue and Lutheranism the common faith. Log houses and churches built during Swedish rule were preserved by the Dutch and some, such as the Lower Swedish Cabin in modern Drexel Hill, Pennsylvania, stand to this day.

In Europe, commercial rivalry had led to the Second Anglo-Dutch War. Although the Dutch Republic had won the war, the Treaty of Breda (1667), forced them to cede their colonies in mainland North America in exchange for the lucrative plantation colony of Suriname in the South American Guyanas.

=== English Pennsylvania ===
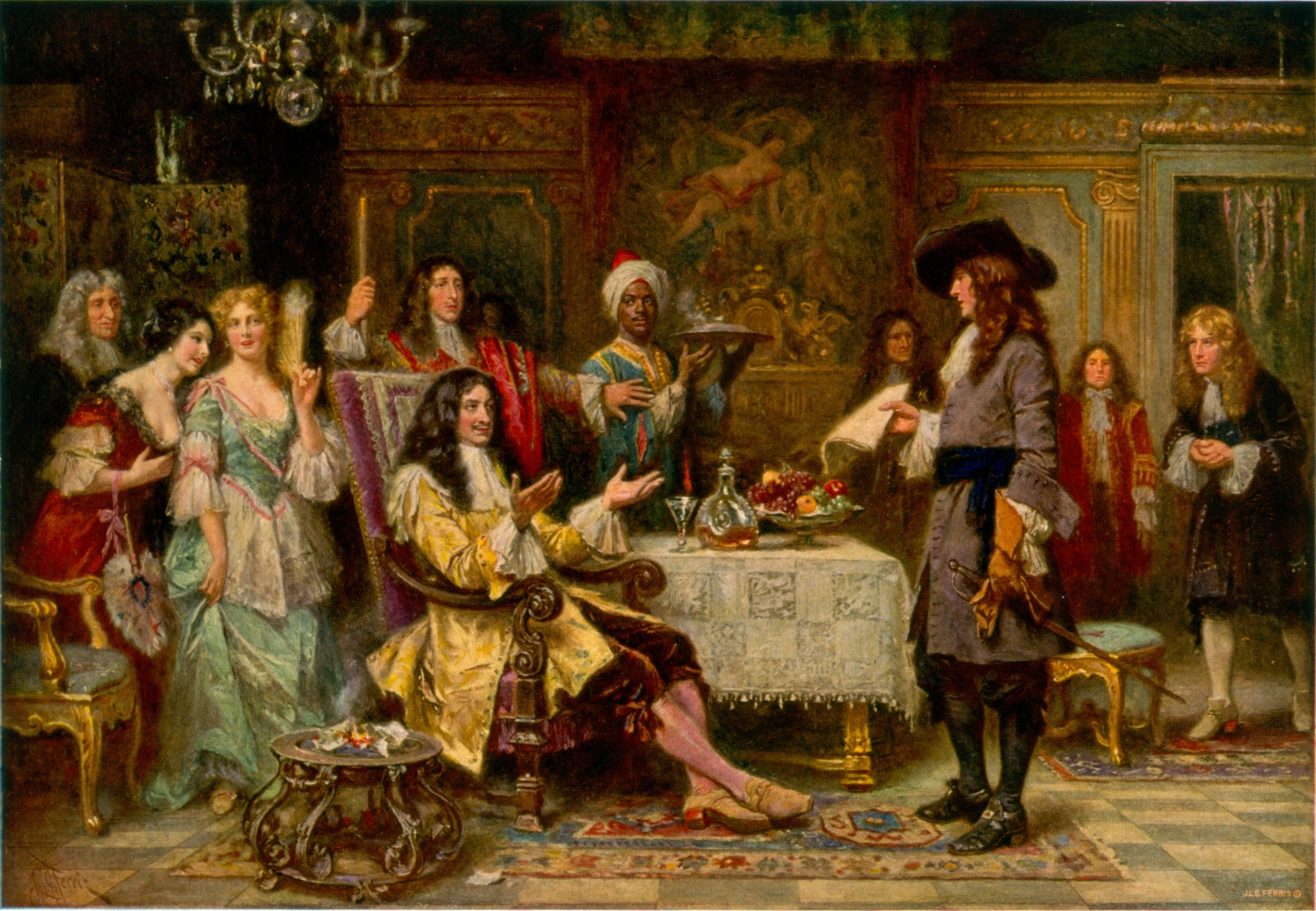
The Birth of Pennsylvania 1680 by Jean Leon Gerome Ferris

On the English victory in the Second Anglo-Dutch war, Charles II of England granted his brother James "all the land from the west side of the Connecticutte River to the east Side of De la Ware bay," and gave him "power and authority of Government". An English fleet was dispatched to lay claim to the Dutch war prize. Governor Peter Stuyvesant, protested but eventually acquiesced in the face of English naval superiority and a lack of morale among his colonists. The English conquest of New Netherland was complete with the fall of Fort Casimir on Delaware bay in 1664. From 1672-1674, during the Third Anglo-Dutch War, the Dutch briefly re-occupied the region, but the 1674 Treaty of Westminster reverted to the status quo ante bellum. During the occupation, the Dutch established three County Courts, which served as the basis for the original counties in later English Pennsylvania and modern Delaware.

Initially Charles' grant applied only to the western shore of Delaware Bay, and the Dutch Vice-Director on the eastern Delaware Bay (modern New Jersey) became bellicose, but he too surrendered, and with that, New Netherland was no more. The Duke of York enfeoffed his land east of the river to Lord John Berkeley and Sir George Carteret, respectively, creating West and East Jersey for them. William Penn, son of the famed naval commander and creditor of the Stuarts, was rewarded with the Delaware River's left bank. James' £16,000 debts to the Penns made him a prime contender for the reward.

The Penns were a wealthy land owning family, possessing several large estates across Britain and Ireland. Penn the elder had been in service of Oliver Cromwell's Commonwealth navy, holding the rank of fleet commander, later vice-admiral of England, and finally general of the sea. He proved to be an adept commander with his victory over the Spanish at Jamaica and effort against the Dutch off the Kentish Knock. He was not too confident in Cromwell, however. On the restoration of Charles, he was elected to parliament–serving Weymouth and Melcombe Regis–and knighted on the same ship boarding the future King of England. Penn had financed the refitting of the English navy for the conquest of New Netherland and other theatres of the Dutch war, all whilst Charles was anxious to use treasury funds. Penn the elder died before he could he could be reimbursed.

Penn's son, also called William, was a member of the mystical Society of Friends. Members of the Protestant sect, called themself Quakers and endured persecution in England and North America for views considered blasphemous. Quaker theology emphasized the priesthood of all believers, it explicitly rejected established hierarchies, and most controversially, forbade oaths. In Massachusetts Bay, Mary Dyer, a Quaker missionary, was hanged for defying a law banning the sect in the Puritan dominated colony. The younger William was in search of a place his fellow Quakers could establish a "Holy experiment," a haven for the creed, additionally one that was lucrative. He persistently nagged Charles for months to entertain his scheme until he eventually yielded. Charles granted 45,000 acres of North American soil to settle the generational debt. "We have thought fitt to erect, and We doe hereby erect the aforesaid Countrey and Islands into a Province and Seigniorie, and doe call itt Pensilvania, and soe from henceforth we will have itt called", the charter said.

Penn successfully worked tirelessly to secure the trust of 600 investors, and in just two years, some 4,000 migrants joined him in his new colony; The population climbed to 11,450 by the close of the decade. Profit from land sales earned him over £9000. He invested his revenue to aid immigration, make ethical transactions with the Lenape, purchase slaves and servants, and erect a large country house, similar to the many he held in England and Ireland. As the first governor, he embezzled tax revenue and speculated in goods such as hosiery and horse collars. His total spendings in the first two years amounted to £10,000– debt he would later carry to England. In 1684, on the verge of bankruptcy, William returned to England to preserve his title to two counties in dispute with the Calvert proprietors of Maryland. This begun the century-long feud between the two families.

By the time Penn arrived at his colony, it contained some 2,000 people, almost entirely Swedes, Finns and some Dutch and Englishmen. 500 people made home to the lower reaches of the Schuylkill Valley where Philadelphia was founded. In Upland (renamed Chester), on December 4-7, 1682, Pennsylvania's first legislature met and passed the first statues of the colony. Earlier in 1682, the Treaty of Shackamaxon was signed by William Penn and leaders of the Lenape. The treaty established relations "as long as the waters [ran] in the rivers and creeks and as long as the stars and moon [endured]." Penn's other early treaties with the natives have been largely lost to time, but he is nonetheless noted to have been ethical and fair in his dealings. Native Americans were even represented alongside Whites on juries. Later Pennsylvanians did not follow his example. French historian Voltaire called the 1682 treaty "the only treaty never sworn to and never broken." Penn maintained peaceful relations with the Indians mostly due to pragmatism and his pacificism motivated by Quaker beliefs. Relations were also shaped by contemporary Indigenous politics. Colonists moved southwest into Brandywine Creek, east into New Jersey, and north to forks of the Delaware, dispossessing the Lenape and forcing them westward. Meanwhile, the late Beaver Wars had reshaped native tribal structures: the Susquehannock, Shawnee and Lenape had been conquered by the Iroquois, with a Covenant Chain bounding them and other indigenous groups together. Suffering from a loss of population from the conflict, they were likely anxious to resist European colonization.

The Lenape throughout the decades were moved further west to make room for settlers. Shamokin and another reservation at Brandywine Creek were created for them by the Provincial government. The latter lasting just 50 years before the entire valley was overran with settlers at the command of Secretary James Logan. The same fate was met by the Lenape that were moved into the Wyoming Valley. Groups beyond the Appalachian Mountains were somewhat better protected against intrusion, but the colonists became increasingly land-hungry and eventually displaced them too. Quakers demonized Lenape mythology and made laborious efforts to evangelize them, despite their strong belief in religious freedom.

When William Penn returned to England in 1684, the vast majority of his time was spent recruiting settlers for his new colonial project. He travelled through England, Wales, Ireland and the Low Countries, advertising Pennsylvania's geographical and economic advantages and its fair treatment of Quakers and fellow allied Protestants. In December of that year, the ship Isabella docked at Philadelphia and unloaded a cargo of 150 slaves from Africa, beginning the history of African Americans in Philadelphia. In 1685, he estimated the population to have been 8,200. For the next 15 years he remained in Europe until his eventual return in 1699 to what was a politically polarized society. He didn't stay long in America, returning to England in 1701 with mounting debts and the looming threat of imprisonment. He spent 9 months in prison and attempted to sell the colony 11 year later in 1712–the same year he nearly came near to death after suffering a stroke. His estates, including Pennsylvania, formally passed onto his wife when he eventually passed in 1718. Hannah Callowhill Penn inherited not only his severe debts, but also the burdensome responsibilities of colonial stewardship when she became governor–the only female to ever hold the role, even to the modern day. She governed for 12 years, holding the office until her death in 1726. The death of both Penns and Chief Tamanend, three pacificists, saw a rise in tensions between settlers and natives.

Penn's efforts in Europe proved successful as colonists, predominately quaker, poured en-masse from the old world. Quakers from all over Europe boarded leaky vessels headed to Philadelphia. Migration was so high that transporting immigrants became an established business. The first winters in the province, from 1694–1697, were harsh. Harvest shortfalls and measle outbreaks, compounded by bad weather and King William's War, ravaged the Province. Those who bore the brunt the hardest were often from poorer black and working class immigrant communities in Philadelphia, as burial records show. Tax rolls show a high degree of wealth inequality, with the top 5% of Philadelphians holding 40-50% of the city's taxable wealth. Quaker estates were appraised at 200% a higher rate than other religious groups.

Immigration continued at a steadfast rate as the 18th century rolled in. The first private school in Philadelphia, William Penn Charter School, was founded in 1689. New arrivals often assimilated to English culture, adopting English language names, but new colonial identities distinct to that of their mother countries also formed. Through waves of immigration, the colony possessed a Pennsylvania Dutch (as the Germans are erroneously called) ethnic culture and a broader German identity dissimilar to that of Europe's. The Scottish St. Andrews Society and Irish Sons of St Patrick were among advocacy organizations founded by immigrant groups. German-speaking people typically came from Württemberg, the Palatinate, and Switzerland. The vast majority of them were Protestant: Lutheran or Reformed (German Calvinists). Others were Anabaptists, Roman Catholics, or members of fringe sects. Pennsylvania Dutch culture helped to distinguish German settlements from English settlements; they had distinct customs, work ethics, housing plans, and farming and cooking methods. The German Mennonites founded Germantown in 1683, and the Amish established the Northkill Amish Settlement in 1740.

Animosity between German and English speakers did exist but eventually dissipated with perceived differences between them shrinking. Germans found similarities that "transcended the politics and localities of the Europe" according to historians Randall M. Miller and William A. Pencak. The first petition against slavery was launched in 1688 by the Germantown Quaker community. The petition was rejected by the colony's leadership, writing "We having inspected ye matter, above mentioned, and considered of it, we find it so weighty that we think it not expedient for us to meddle with it here." In 1775, a group of Philadelphia Quakers organized the Society for the Relief of Free Negroes Unlawfully Held in Bondage, the first American abolition society.

After Penn's treaty, the next major land purchase was the Walking Purchase, made by his sons in 1737. In 1749, fur trader George Croghan purchased over 100,000 acres of land spanning present day Beaver County and most of southwestern Pennsylvania from the Six Nations of the Iroquois Confederacy, offering tobacco, blankets and gunpowder. On July 6, 1754, Pennsylvania officials paid the six nations £400 in New York currency for about 5 million acres of land in central and western Pennsylvania. The final colonial purchase came in 1768 with the Treaty of Fort Stanwix when almost the entire Appalachian Range in Pennsylvania was annexed.

==== Walking Purchase ====
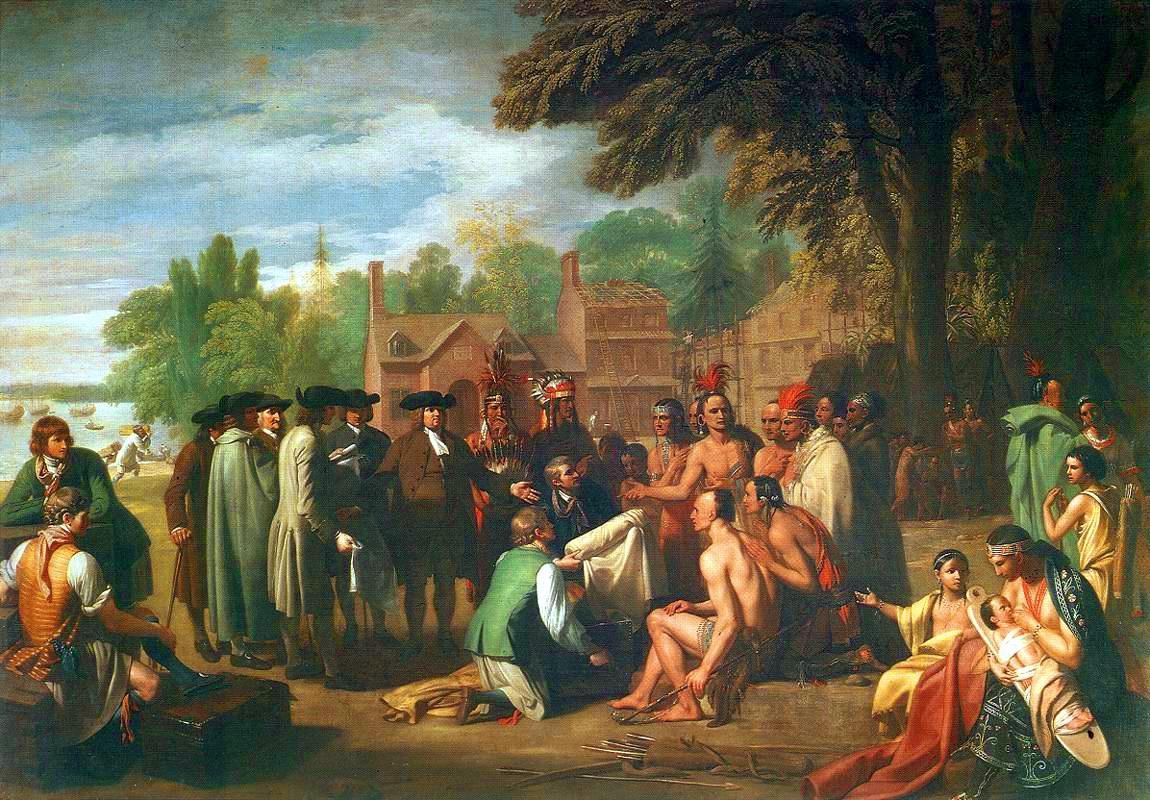
Benjamin West's 1771 portrait of William Penn's 1682 treaty with the Lenape

William Penn's sons, Thomas and John, who governed the colony, accelerated the dispossession of native Americans in Pennsylvania. Unlike William, they were not devout Quakers, but like William, they had poor financial foresight. Taking their father's example, they utilized land sales and the collection of quit-rents for a living, and became unnerved by the knowledge that there were squatters from New York and elsewhere settling in the Lehigh Valley and along the upper reaches of the Delaware River. This curtailed their flow of income through land sales in northern Pennsylvania. To expand Pennsylvania, the Penns drafted a treaty which would have granted the colony Lenape lands beginning between the junction of the Delaware and Lehigh River in present-day Easton "as far west as a man could walk in a day and a half," a common unit of measurement among indigenous tribes in Pennsylvania. Records show that as early as 1735, this had been planned. The Penns reminded chiefs Manawkyhickon, Lapowinsa, Tishcohan, and Nutimas of their end of this treaty that must be upheld. Secretary James Logan hired the three fastest runners in the colony to run out the purchase on a trail that had been cleared by other members of the colony beforehand. The runners started at modern Wrightstown and finished near the town of Jim Thorpe in Carbon County, in 1737, annexing 750,000 acres to the Penn estate in the process. The runners' pace was so intense that only one runner completed the "walk", covering an astonishing 70 miles (110 km). This netted the Penns an area roughly equivalent to the size of the state of Rhode Island in the purchase. The area of the purchase covers all or part of what are now Pike, Monroe, Carbon, Schuylkill, Northampton, Lehigh, and Bucks counties. The Lenape would become enraged at the treaty, and would commit Penn's Creek massacre 19 years later. The massacre resulted in the death of 14 settlers in central Pennsylvania at the hands of the Lenape.

=== Prosperity and limits on further settlement ===
Until the French and Indian War, Pennsylvania had no military, few taxes, and no public debt. It also encouraged the rapid growth of Philadelphia into America's most important city and of the Pennsylvania Dutch Country hinterlands. Philadelphia was not only the first capital of the Province, but also the colonial era capital of the Thirteen Colonies. It emerged as a major port, commercial city, and "the best poor man's country," as one local put it. With over 20,000 inhabitants, its population had surpassed Boston and New York City, each of which had a half-century head start. Small towns and individual farms dotted the Pennsylvania hinterland and were tied to Philadelphia's newspaper. The city was described shortly before the revolution as "one of the most considerable of England's colonies" because "none had thrived more, nor is more rich and prosperous." The largest producer of Iron ore outside of Great Britain during the 18th century was Pennsylvania. In 1751, Pennsylvania Hospital, the first hospital in British America, and The Academy and College of Philadelphia, the predecessor to the private University of Pennsylvania, both opened. Benjamin Franklin founded both of these institutions and Philadelphia's Union Fire Company 15 years earlier, in 1736. In 1751, the Pennsylvania State House ordered a new bell for the bell tower on Pennsylvania State House in Philadelphia, which later was renamed the Liberty Bell.

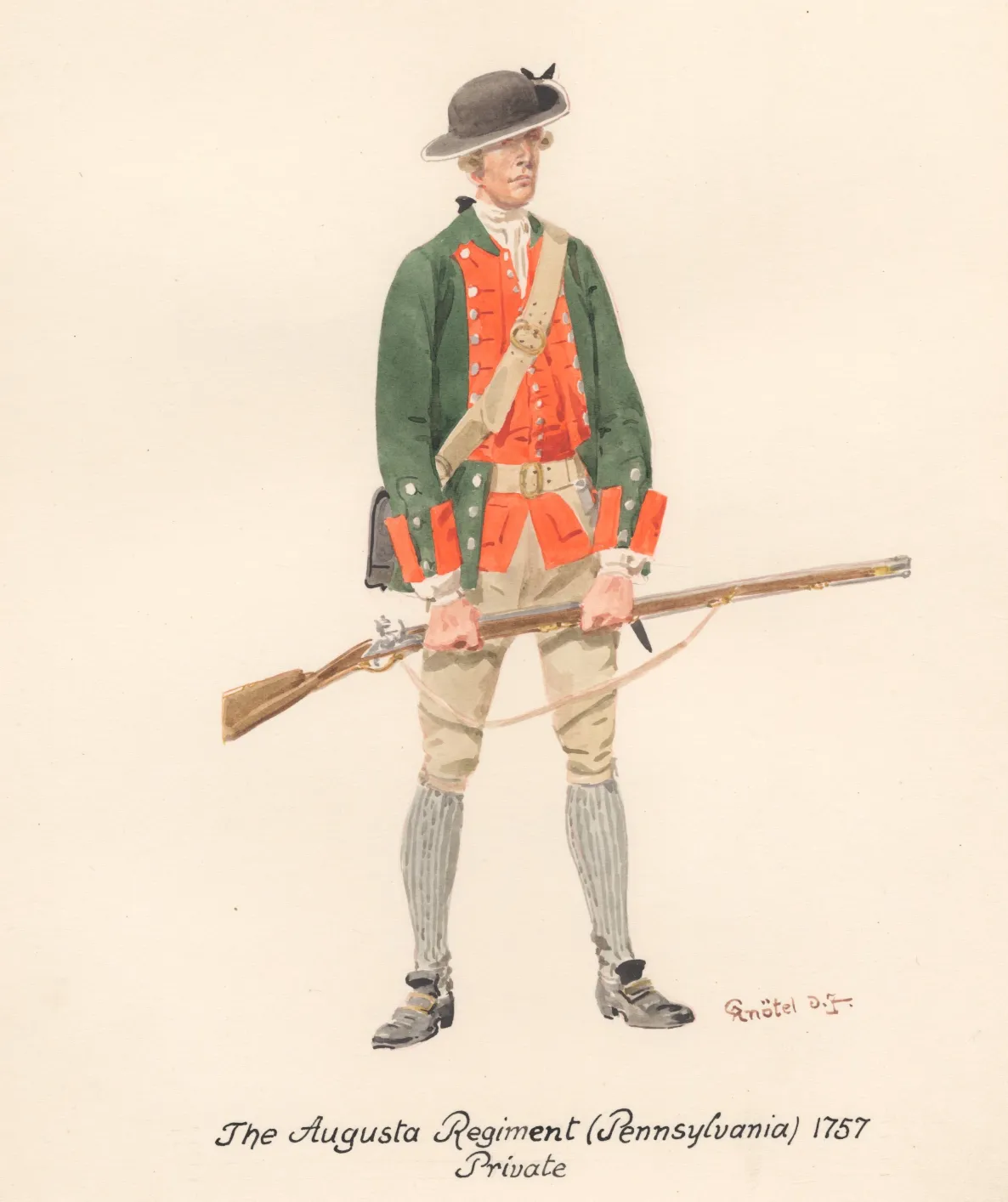
Illustration of a Pennsylvanian provincial soldier in 1757

As the colony grew, colonists and British military forces came into confrontation with natives in the state's Western half. Britain fought for control of the neighboring Ohio Country with France during the French and Indian War. Following the British victory, the territory was formally ceded to them in 1763, and became part of the British Empire. In 1757, 23,000 square miles of land purchased from the six nations was returned to them following a disagreement with the British Board of Trade. The Quakers had refused to provide any assistance to New England's Indian wars.

With the French and Indian War over and Pontiac's War just beginning, the Royal Proclamation of 1763 banned colonization beyond the Appalachian Mountains to prevent settlers settling lands that Indians tribes were using. This proclamation impacted Pennsylvanians and Virginians the most, since they both had been racing towards the lands surrounding Fort Pitt in modern-day Pittsburgh.

=== American Revolution ===
During the American Revolution and American Revolutionary War, Philadelphia was the hotbed of the revolution.

When tensions broke out between the crown and Thirteen Colonies, Philadelphia became a centralized location for writing, thought and theory for independence.

During the American Revolution and Revolutionary War, both the First and Second Continental Congress convened in Philadelphia. In 1775, after the Revolutionary War broke out with the Battles of Lexington and Concord, the Second Continental Congress, meeting inside present-day Independence Hall, formed the Continental Army and unanimously selected George Washington as the new army's commander-in-chief.

The following year, in June 1776, Thomas Jefferson authored the first draft of the Declaration of Independence from his second floor apartment at present-day 700 Market Street; on July 4, the Declaration was unanimously adopted and issued to King George III by all 56 delegates to the convention.

Between July 1776 and November 1777, the Second Continental Congress debated and authored the Articles of Confederation at Independence Hall in Philadelphia.

On September 26, 1777, during the British Army's Philadelphia campaign, Philadelphia fell to the British, who occupied the city through June 1778, forcing Washington and 12,000 Continental Army troops to retreat to Valley Forge, where as many as 2,000 died from disease or starvation over the harsh winter of 1777–1778.

Following independence, the Constitution of the United States, now the longest-standing written constitution in the world, was debated, authored, and implemented at the Constitutional Convention, which met inside Independence Hall from May 25 to September 17, 1787, with George Washington presiding as the convention's president.

During the American Revolution, Philadelphia was the second-most populous city in the entire British Empire after London.

=== Post-independence ===
Once American independence was secured, Philadelphia continued to serve as the nation's capital from 1790 to until 1800, while the new national capital city in Washington, D.C. was constructed. Both George Washington, the nation's first president, and John Adams, the nation's second president, lived and worked from President's House in Philadelphia while the White House was being constructed in Washington, D.C. In November 1800, near the end of his administration, Adams relocated to the White House through the end of his term in March 1801, becoming the first U.S. president to work and reside there.

== Government ==
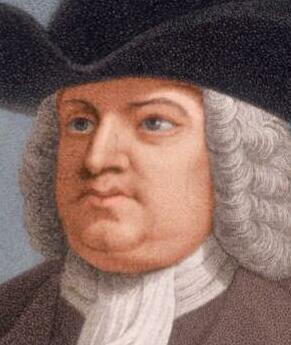
William Penn, entitled The True and absolute Proprietor of Pennsylvania

The Province of Pennsylvania's colonial government was established in 1683 by William Penn's Frame of Government. Penn was appointed governor by the English crown, and a 72-member Provincial Council and larger General Assembly were responsible for governing the province. The General Assembly, Pennsylvania Provincial Assembly, was the largest and most representative branch of government but had limited powers. Pennsylvania is also the birthplace of the county commission, a form of local government that later spread to other parts of the continent. The commissions evolved from appointed local tax collectors in 1711 to a three person county board by 1725 with three year terms for office holders. The system largely replaced justices of the peace and worked to give property owners direct representation in colonial government.

In Upland, then-to-be Chester, on December 4-7, 1682, Pennsylvania's first legislature session met and passed the first statues of the colony.

Succeeding frames of government were produced in 1683, 1696, and 1701.

According to the first Charter of Pennsylvania, it was to be feudal estate, the personal holding of the Penn family. The Penns held broad proprietary authority to appoint governors and collect quit-rents, in typical feudal fashion. He could also create towns and appoint judges. Governors were officially styled as The True and absolute Proprietor of Pennsylvania. The governor's power was checked by the Privy Council that could veto their actions, and furthermore and the Crown had power to hear appeals from litigation in the colony. According to the royal founding charter, Pennsylvania was held by "fealty only for all Services, and not in Capite or by Knights Service": the charter goes on to say that it is de jure a seignory, that is land held solely by homage and fealty, or "in free and comon Socage," to use the charter's own words. There is one caveat, however: Penn was ordered to "[Yield] and [pay] therefore to Us [the crown] [...] Two Beaver Skins, to bee delivered at Our said Castle of Windsor on the First Day of January in every Year; and also the Fifth Part of all Gold and Silver Oare, which shall from Time to Time happen to bee found within the Limitts aforesaid, cleare of all Charges."

Penn envisioned that the upper house, to be the Council, would draft bills for the lower house, and that the Assembly, would then have the final say. He was reluctant to give an assembly power over his estates, however due to constitutional developments in England, it was imperative that the colony adopt English liberties, such as a government with checks and balances, trial by jury and religious freedom. Penn's charter guarantees this and was trumped by his Frame of Government. The legislature was dominated by Quakers that lamented William Penn's elitist views and often shot down his reform attempts. A charter amendment calling for strengthened property rights and smaller government passed in 1684. However for the next two years, Penn was absent as he suddenly had his colony forfeited on allegations of treason. On his acquittal, two successive governments were formed.

The Royal Charter encourages the constitution of "wholesome Ordinances, from time to time, [...] to bee kept and observed, as well for the preservation of the peace, as for the better government of the People there inhabiting" In 1701, Penn finally signed the Charter of Privileges, a foundational document that remained the Province's constitution until 1776 (though frequently amended). The Charter only received assent with the strenuous persistence from the Quaker-dominated legislature. The final product was much more liberal than Penn had intended: it deflated the power of the colony's elite and enfranchised many commoners. Men owning 50 acres or estates worth at least £50 could vote, a threshold that included most free men in the countryside, but few urban residents.

=== Legal Code ===
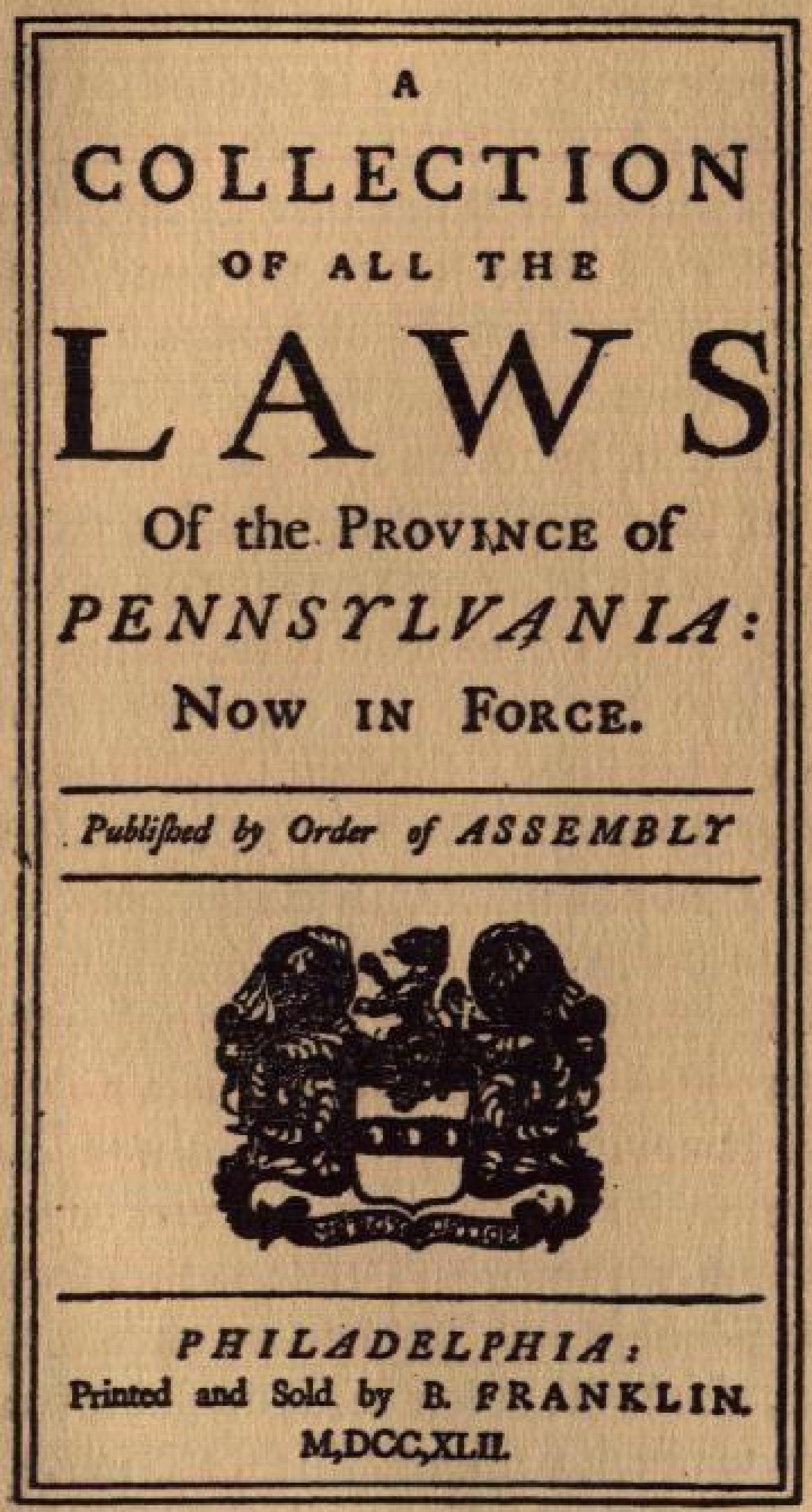
Collection of Laws of Province of Pennsylvania by Benjamin Franklin

Religion had a firm grip over government. Quakers fused the English legal traditions with the ideals of their "Holy Experiment" - "a Holy experiment...that an example may be set up to the nations." According to Penn himself, government was a "venerable ordinance of God." He believed that "such Laws as shall best preserve true Christian and Civil Liberty." The Charter of Privileges mandated that office holders profess their faith in Jesus Christ, "the Son of God and Savior of the World."

All Persons who profess to believe in Jesus Christ, the Saviour, shall be capable to serve this Government in any Capacity, he solemnly promising Allegiance to the King and Fidelity to the Proprietary and Governor, and taking the Attests as now established.

— Charter of Privileges Granted by William Penn, esq. to the Inhabitants of Pennsylvania and Territories, October 28, 1701

The Colony's legal code was revised several times in 1682, 1683, 1693, 1700, 1705 and finally 1718. Quakers further amended the legal code largely eliminating the death penalty, a deviation from the European model of justice. The justice system was effectively two-tiered and laws were selectively enforced on a racial basis. A white man could not be convicted of attempted rape, but black men who were convicted faced castration. The testimony of a black person carried little weight, making justice for the rape of free and enslaved black women a rarity, although they were still allowed to testify unlike in the southern plantation colonies. As more black Pennsylvanians were manumitted in the 18th century, the colony's legislature passed several "Black Codes" to regulate their freedom. The first of these was An Act for the Trial of Negroes in 1700, this was amended with An Act for the Better Regulating of Negroes in This Province in 1725 and 1726. The 1700 statue separated black residents from the standard legal system by creating special courts and special judges and distinct penalties.

Besides incarceration and workhousing, punishments such as branding, disfigurement and beating were utilized for justice. "it were an happy Day if men could bound and qualifie their Resentments with Charity to the Offender: For then our Anger would be without Sin and better convict and edifie the Guilty which along make it lawful," William Penn wrote. Although Pennsylvania's charter mandates that laws be modeled on England's, the Province's code often divagated from the English custom, namely in areas such as marriage law. In 1718, George I's Privy Council repudiated most of the colony's radical laws perceived as contrary to that of the mother country. The law gradually reoriented toward the British model in the century before the American revolution.

The religious underpinning in the first Great Laws are blatant. Pennsylvanians are expressly forbidden to perform "Common Toyle" on the "first day of the Week called the Lord's day." To "take the Lord's name in vain" or bear "false witness" was an offence, as was wasting time in "worldly amusements" such as card games, bullbaiting and "riotous sports." The "days of the Week and Months of the Year" were to be known as they were in scripture, and alcohol sale to the natives was outlawed as the "Indians are not able to Govern themselves in their use of it..."

Pennsylvania's law on marriage gave parents more control over their children and, in contrast to England, forbade girls and boys running away to get married. Because the parents of many residents lived overseas this was a trick to enforce. An Act to Prevent Clandestine, Loose and unseemly proceedings in this Province ... regarding Marriage changed the law so that the parents would be consulted "if possible". The law was amended twice, first in 1700 and lastly in 1729 which provided that parents living in the province be given one months notice and provide a certificate. This law remained stood unchanged till the mid 19th century. Divorce was permitted on the grounds of bestiality, bigamy and adultery. Sharp racial distinctions were made to protect the slave system as an independent family life would have hindered the ability of a slave master to sell husbands, wives and children. Enslaved people had no legal right to marriage, and after 1725, interracial marriage was banned.

==== Slavery ====
An Act for the Better Regulating of Negroes in this Province (March 5, 1725 – 1726), effectively codified the second-class status of black Pennsylvanians:

- (Section I) if a slave was sentenced to death, the owner would be paid full value for the slave.
- (Sec II) Duties on slaves transported from other colonies for a crime are doubled.
- (Sec III) If a slave is freed, the owner must have a sureties bond of £30 to indemnify the local government in case he/she becomes incapable of supporting himself.
- (Sec IV) A freed slave fit but unwilling to work shall be bound out [as an indentured servant] on a year-to-year basis as the magistrates see fit. And their male children may be bound out until 24 and women children until 21.
- (Sec V) Free Negroes and Mulattoes cannot entertain, barter or trade with slaves or bound servants in their homes without leave and consent of their master under penalty of fines and whipping.
- (Sec VI) If fines cannot be paid, the freeman can be bound out.
- (Sec VII) A minister, pastor, or magistrate who marries a negro to a white is fined £100.
- (Sec VIII) If a white cohabits under pretense of being married with a negro, the white will be fined 30 shillings or bound out for seven years, and the white person's children will be bound out until 31. If a free negro marries a white, they become slaves during life. If a free negro commits fornication or adultery with a white, they are bound out for 7 years. The white person shall be punished for fornication or adultery under existing law.
- (Sec IX) Slaves tippling or drinking at or near a liquor shop or out after nine, 10 lashes.
- (Sec X) If more than 10 miles from their master's home, 10 lashes.
- (Sec XI) Masters not allowed to have their slaves to find and or go to work at their own will receive a 20 shilling fine.
- (Sec XII) Harboring or concealing a slave: a 30 shillings a day fine.
- (Sec XIII) Fine to be used to pay the owners of slaves sentenced to death.

== Demography ==
=== Religion ===
Pennsylvania begun as a solely Quaker "holy experiment," later supplemented with allied protestants such as the Mennonites, Moravians and Amish. Soon Jews and more Christian groups such as the Presbyterians, Lutherans, Calvinists and Roman Catholics established a presence.

Waves of migration shaped Pennsylvania's religiously diversity. The reformed Christian sects and Jews established congregations or religious institutions similar to those in their birthplace. The vast majority of Jews in Pennsylvania were Sephardim from the Spanish Empire. The Quakers largely came from Great Britain and Ireland; Other Protestant sects such as the Mennonites and Amish from German-speaking Europe. Pennsylvania's constitution, the Frame of Government, guaranteed that those who believed in God would not be "molested or prejudiced for their religious Persuasion or Practice." The religious pluralism Pennsylvania offered was a double-edged sword for some; There was a saying at the time that Pennsylvania was heaven for farmers and artisans but hell for preachers. No Church court, congregation or minister could coalesce power in the colony, and the people were largely at will to choose their sect.

In Philadelphia, mistrusting hierarchies, most residents belonged to no established church, and the countryside contained even more "heathenry," as the preachers decried. A 1699 census counted 947 Quakers, 550 Anglicans and 969 Presbyterian Baptists in the capital. In addition, there were 213 enslaved Africans, few baptized as Christians and likely adhering to a traditional religion or Islam.

Pennsylvania had been dominated by a Quaker elite since its founding. Tax rolls from 1693 show Quaker estates being appraised at £195 compared to £69 for non-friends. What distinguished the Society of Friends from other sects was their insularity, which increased vastly as the Great Awakening came. They discouraged conversion, frequently disowned less committed members and shunned political officeholding. The Quakers had also pushed for social reform, and led most anti-slavery activism. The first great awakening saw a decline in infantile baptism, naming Godparents (because parents did not often know or trust their neighbors). Holiday celebrations, such as Christmas, were also disdained by many sects. Later, in the Commonwealth of Pennsylvania, New Hanover County, Rev. Henry Melchior was driven to tears upon learning that some good Lutherans were celebrating Christmas. Ironically, the custom of having a decorated Christmas tree spread from Pennsylvania to the rest of the United States.

The Great Awakening, in 1730, swept through the colony. Open air meetings conflagrated the reform impulse; reformists disdained the orthodox church hierarchy and emphasized a "brotherhood and sisterhood" of believers. The idea of universal salvation motivated proselytization among society's lower class, including slaves. Black and White Pennsylvanians formed the first integrated communities in North America; Presbyterians formed new congregations; Baptism flourished and as did Methodism. Elizabeth Ashbridge, a literary critic, became one of the first female Quaker ministers during this period. Her autobiography described her experience as a female preacher in 18th century Pennsylvania. George Whitefield's emphatic preaching swayed many Pennsylvanians during his ministry. One Philadelphia woman, Hannah Harkum, was so enamored with his sermons that she walked twenty miles with crowds of people at every opportunity to hear him. Writer Benjamin Franklin once came with a skeptical mind to hear the preacher, and only left after emptying his pockets into the church's collection plate.

The colony's reputation as a safe-haven for those whose beliefs deviated from the orthodoxy in Europe was well known by the 18th century. German mystic Johannes Kelpius exported his "Society of Women in the Wilderness," a fringe sect predicting the return of Jesus Christ in the wilderness in 1694. In 1732, German-born Lutheran Johann Conrad Beissel, founder of the Society of Solitary Brethren, founded the monastic community of Ephrata Cloister. The community was semi-medieval in character according to historian Miller Pencack: the community practiced book illumination and monastic celibacy, but also "high-tech" activities like milling, printing and horology. At its peak Beissel's community had 300 inhabitants.

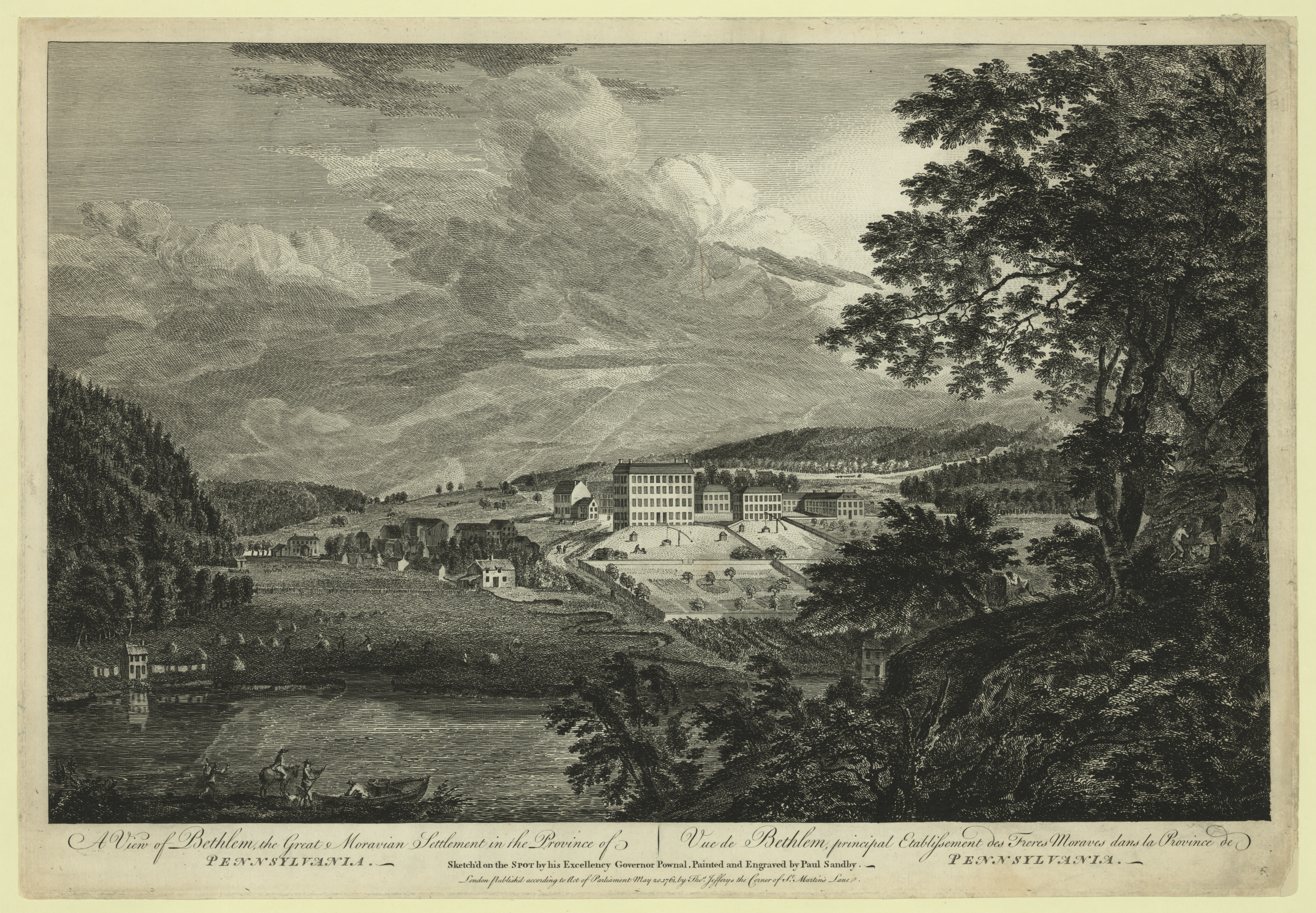
A view of Bethlem, the great Moravian settlement in the province of Pennsylvania (1761)

The Moravians, from what is now Czechia, were a growing force under the ministry of Count Nicholas Von Zinzendorf. Zinzendorf himself visited the colony in 1741, and whilst there met Benjamin Franklin and representatives of the Iroquois Nation. With the help of Conrad Weiser, he laid the patchworks for a settlement in North America. That same year, the towns of Bethlehem and Nazareth were founded. Much like the Quakers, the Moravians were a pacificist protestant sect. Their settlements were unlike Quakers in their unique approach to family life and gender equality, though. Moravian settlements were composed of "choirs" rather than nuclear families. As young as 18 months, children would be removed from their family home to live in these choirs that catered to their social status and sex.

Shortly after the American revolution, in the 1780s, Swedish Lutherans in the Philadelphia area took a census of member families. The biggest insight into ethnic identity in the colonial era of Pennsylvania comes from this census. Barely half of the 74 adults identified as Swedes. 1/4 reported being English, German. or Irish. The remainder called themselves Scottish, Dutch, African, French, Negro, or Welsh. The only self-reported "American" was the sixteen-year-old son of African parents. Also counted in the census were non-Lutherans: eight Quakers, six Methodists, two Roman Catholics, plus one Presbyterian, one Huguenot, and one Anabaptist. No doubt, affecting the data is the fact that not all nominal Lutherans attended church or baptized their children.

=== Data ===
The following population table excludes Native Americans.

Year	Pennsylvanyia (total)	Philadelphia	Germantown	Lancaster	Pittsburgh	Growth
1680	680	0	0	-	-	-
1690	11,459	2,031	147	-	-	+10,779 (±90%)
1700	17,950	3,220	220	-	-	+6,941 (±56.64%)
1710	24,450	4,415	248	-	-	+6,500 (±36.21%)
1720	30,962	5,940	279	-	-	+6,512 (±26.63%)
1730	51,707	7,500	310	?	-	+20,745 (±67.1%)
1740	85,637	8,720	372	960	-	+33,930 (±65.61%)
1750	119,666	12,736	785	1,912	-	+4,016 (±31.53%)
1760	183,703	18,757	1,562	2,839	201	+64,037 (±53.51%)
1770	240,057	28,802	2,152	2,832	c. 100	+56,350 (±30.67%)

Estimated arrivals through the Port of Philadelphia, 1720-1769:

Decade	Caribbean & Africa	Ireland	Amsterdam
1720	135	-	2,956
1730	424	3,811	13,006
1740	256	6,035	20,850
1750	283	6,944	30,374
1760	1,148	9,221	8,058

== Counties ==
Despite having the land grant from King Charles II, Penn embarked on an effort to purchase the lands from Native Americans. The Lenape tribe held much of the land near present-day Philadelphia, and they expected payment in exchange for a quitclaim to vacate the territory. Penn and his representatives (Proprietors) negotiated a series of treaties with the Lenape and other tribes that had an interest in the land in his royal grant.

The initial treaties were conducted between 1682 and 1684, for tracts between New Jersey and the former Delaware Colony in present-day Delaware. The province was divided into three counties, plus the three Lower counties on Delaware Bay, including Bucks County, Philadelphia County, and Chester County.

=== Lower counties ===
The lower counties on Delaware, a separate colony within the province, included the three counties of present-day Delaware: New Castle, Sussex, and Kent County.

=== New lands and counties ===
Several decades into the 18th century, additional treaties with Native Americans were concluded. The colony's proprietors made treaties in 1718, 1732, 1737, 1749, 1754, and 1754, pushing the boundaries of the colony, which were still within the original royal grant, north and west. By the time the French and Indian War began in 1754, the Assembly had established additional counties, including Lancaster (1729), York (1749), Cumberland (1750), Berks (1752), and Northampton (1752).

After the French and Indian War concluded, an additional treaty was made in 1768, which codified the limits of the Royal Proclamation of 1763, which provided a temporary boundary that could be extended further west in an orderly manner by the royal government but not by private individuals, such as the proprietors. This agreement altered the original royal land grant to Penn.

The next acquisitions by Pennsylvania took place after Pennsylvania became part of the United States, following its ratification of the U.S. Constitution.

The Pennsylvania General Assembly established three additional counties prior to the American Revolutionary War: Bedford (1771), Northumberland (1772), and Westmoreland (1773).

== Judiciary ==
The Supreme Court of Pennsylvania, consisting of the Chief Justice and at least one other judge, was founded by statute in 1722 (although dating back to 1684 as the Provincial Court) and sat in Philadelphia twice a year.

Chief Justices
Incumbent	Tenure	
Incumbent	Took office	Left office
Arthur Cook	1681	1684
Nicholas Moore	1684	1685
Arthur Cook	1686	1690
John Simcock	1690	1693
Andrew Robson	1693	1699
Edward Shippen	1699	1701
John Guest	August 20, 1701	April 10, 1703
William Clark	April 10, 1703	1705
John Guest	1705	1706
Roger Mompesson	April 17, 1706	1715
Joseph Growden, Jr.	1715	1718
David Lloyd	1718	1731
James Logan	August 20, 1731	1739
Jeremiah Langhorne	August 13, 1739	1743
John Kinsey	April 5, 1743	1750
William Allen	September 20, 1750	1774
Benjamin Chew	April 29, 1774	1776

== Notable people ==
- John Dickinson, Founding Father of the United States
- Benjamin Franklin moved to Philadelphia at age 17 in 1723; he was Pennsylvania's most famous citizen during his later years. Among his accomplishments was founding in 1751 the Academy and College of Philadelphia, the predecessor to the private University of Pennsylvania. Franklin was also a strong advocate for a state militia, creating his own extra-legal militia when the state assembly would not during King George's War
- Thomas McKean was born in New London, Pennsylvania. He was an officer in the Continental Army during the American Revolution, a signer of the Declaration of Independence, the second President of the U.S. Congress under the Articles of Confederation, Acting President of Delaware, and Chief Justice and Governor of Pennsylvania
- Gouverneur Morris, one of the leading minds of the American Revolution, lived in New York City during most of the colonial period but moved to Philadelphia to work as a lawyer and merchant during the Revolution
- Robert Morris moved to Philadelphia around 1749 at about age 14. He was known as the Financier of the Revolution because of his role in securing financial assistance for the American Colonial side in the Revolutionary War. In 1921, Robert Morris University was founded and named after him
- John Morton was born in Ridley Township, Pennsylvania. He was a delegate to the Continental Congress and a signatory to the Continental Association and the United States Declaration of Independence
- Timothy Murphy a Continental Army marksman
- Abraham op den Graeff was an original founder of Germantown, Philadelphia, member of the Pennsylvania Provincial Assembly and signer of the first organized religious protest against slavery in colonial America
- Thomas Paine emigrated to Philadelphia in 1774 at Benjamin Franklin's urging. His tract, Common Sense, published in 1776, was arguably the most famous and influential argument for the American Revolution. He was also the first to champion the phrase "United States of America" publicly
- William Penn was the colony's founder and son of naval Admiral Sir William Penn
- George Ross was born in New Castle, Delaware and moved to Philadelphia to practice law. He was a delegate to the Continental Congress and a signatory to the Continental Association and the United States Declaration of Independence
- Peggy Shippen was the daughter of prominent Philadelphia merchant Edward Shippen and wife of Benedict Arnold
- Arthur St. Clair moved to Ligonier Valley, Pennsylvania in 1764. He served as a judge in colonial Pennsylvania, a general in the Continental Army, and a President under the Articles of Confederation
- Samuel Van Leer, (1747–1825) ironmaster and captain in the American Revolutionary War
- Benjamin West an artist and President of the Royal Academy of Arts.
- Anthony Wayne, American Revolutionary War general
- James Wilson moved to Philadelphia in 1765 and became a lawyer. He signed the Declaration of Independence and wrote or worked on many of the most challenging compromises in the U.S. Constitution, including the Three-Fifths Compromise, which defined slaves as three-fifths of a person for purposes of census-taking, the number of members to be elected to U. S. House of Representatives, and government appropriations

== See also ==
- Fort Augusta
- Fort Dupuy
- Great Wagon Road
- Independence Hall, originally Pennsylvania State House
- List of colonial governors of Pennsylvania
- Pennsylvania in the American Revolution
- Restoration colony
- Walking Purchase
- Welsh Tract

== Bibliography ==
- Miller, Randall M.; Pencak, William, eds. (2002). Pennsylvania: A History of the Commonwealth. Pennsylvania State University Press. ISBN 9780271022147.
- Barr, Daniel P. (2014). A Colony Sprung from Hell: Pittsburgh and the Struggle for Authority on the Western Pennsylvania Frontier, 1744–1794. Kent: The Kent State University Press. ISBN 978-1606351901.
- Illick, Joseph E. (1976). Colonial Pennsylvania: A History. New York: Scribner. ISBN 978-0684145655.
- Lamberton, E. V., et al. "Colonial Libraries of Pennsylvania." The Pennsylvania Magazine of History and Biography, vol. 42, no. 3, 1918, pp. 193–234. online
- Leonard, Joan de Lourdes. "Elections in Colonial Pennsylvania." William and Mary Quarterly 11#3 1954, pp. 385–401. online
- Merrell, James H. (1999). Into the American Woods: Negotiators on the Colonial Pennsylvania. New York: W W Norton & Co. ISBN 978-0393046762.
- Nash, Gary B. Quakers and Politics: Pennsylvania, 1681-1726 (Princeton UP, 1993)
- Smolenski, John. "Embodied politics: the Paxton uprising and the gendering of civic culture in colonial Pennsylvania." Early American Studies 14.2 (2016): 377-407 online.
- Smolenski, John. Friends and Strangers: The Making of a Creole Culture in Colonial Pennsylvania (U of Pennsylvania Press, 2010).
- Spero, Patrick (2016). Frontier Country: The Politics of War in Early Pennsylvania. Philadelphia: University of Pennsylvania Press. ISBN 978-0812248616.
- Tully, Alan. Forming American Politics: Ideals, Interests, and Institutions in Colonial New York and Pennsylvania (JHU Press, 2019).
