= List of people from Chester, Pennsylvania =

The following is a list of notable residents, natives, and persons generally associated with the city of Chester, Pennsylvania, the first city in Pennsylvania.

== A ==
- Al Alberts, lead singer of The Four Aces
- Samuel Anderson, U.S. congressman for Pennsylvania's 4th congressional district
- William Anderson, major in the Continental Army and U.S. congressman
- Henry Graham Ashmead, journalist and historian of Delaware County, Pennsylvania

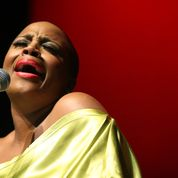
Singer AverySunshine's real name is Denise White. Her stage name is derived from the characters Shug Avery in The Color Purple and Sunshine from Harlem Nights.

- AverySunshine, soul singer

== B ==
- J. Pius Barbour, executive director of the National Baptist Association, mentor to then-college student Martin Luther King Jr.

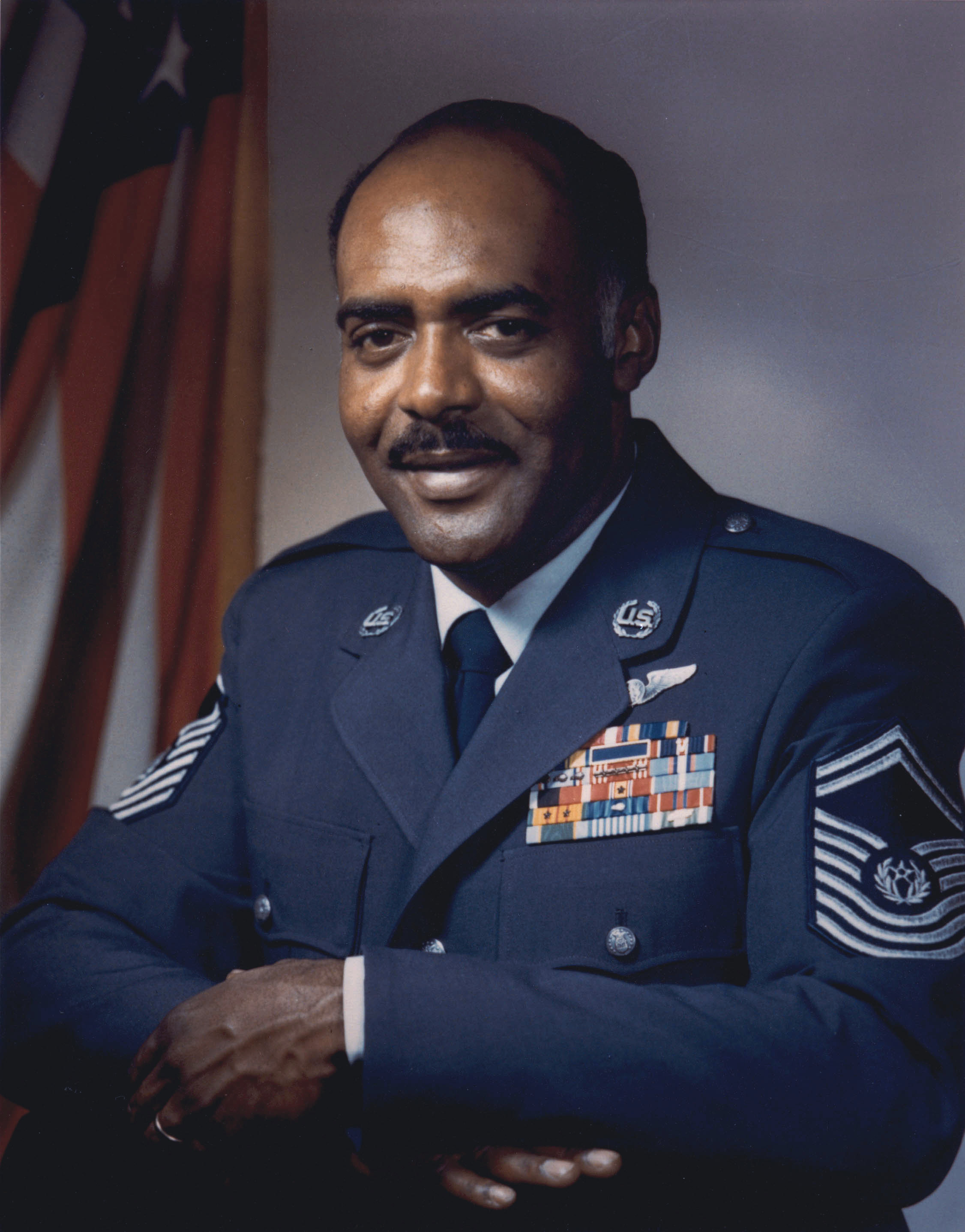
Thomas N. Barnes, the first African-American chief master sergeant of the Air Force

- Thomas N. Barnes, first African-American chief master sergeant of the Air Force
- Joseph F. Battle Jr., 25th mayor of Chester, judge on Delaware County Court of Common Pleas
- Emerson Baynard, professional basketball player
- Ruth L. Bennett, social worker, first president of the Chester branch of the NAACP
- William H. Berry, 10th mayor of Chester and Treasurer of Pennsylvania
- The Beat Bully (Anthony Tucker), record producer and songwriter
- Jahlil Beats, music producer
- Marcus Belgrave, jazz trumpeter
- Crosby M. Black, Pennsylvania state representative for Delaware County, 7th mayor of Chester
- Ed Blizzard, prominent pharmaceutical injury attorney
- Louis A. Bloom, Pennsylvania state representative for Delaware County (1947–1952), judge on Pennsylvania Court of Common Pleas for Delaware County
- Barbara Bohannan-Sheppard, 27th mayor of Chester
- Stanley Branche, civil rights leader, founder of the Committee for Freedom Now
- Ethel H. Brewster, Swarthmore College professor and philologist
- Fran Brill, voice actress and Muppeteer
- Anna Broomall, obstetrician, surgeon and educator
- Wendell Butler Jr., mayor of Chester

== C ==
- George Campbell, soccer player
- Lamar Campbell, former NFL defensive back
- Ted Cather, professional baseball player
- Dorothy Chacko, social worker, medical doctor, Padma Shri award recipient
- E. Wallace Chadwick, U.S. congressman
- Robert Chadwick, Pennsylvania state representative for Delaware County
- Joe Chambers, jazz drummer
- Tom Chism, Major League Baseball player
- Thomas Clyde, founder of the Clyde Line of steamers

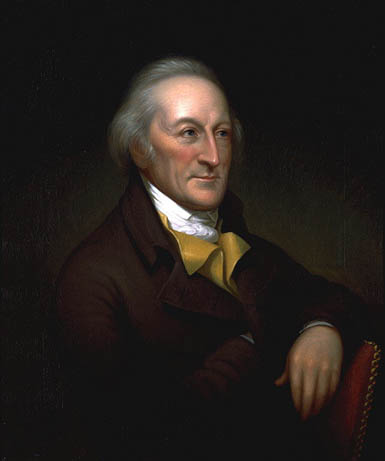
George Clymer, who fled Philadelphia due to the British Army's assault during the American Revolutionary War, lived on a farm in Chester with his family.

- George Clymer, Founding Father of the United States, signer of the United States Declaration of Independence, lived in Chester with his family during the British Army assault on Philadelphia
- Joseph R. T. Coates, 5th mayor of Chester and officer in the Union Army during the American Civil War
- Audrey B. Collins, United States district judge
- Lawrence A. Conner, Sr., Pennsylvania state representative for Delaware County (1953–1954)
- Bill Cottrell, professional football player
- Ted Cottrell, NFL player and coach
- Walter H. Craig, Pennsylvania state representative for Delaware County (1923–1925), Chester City Council member (1925–1937)
- John Price Crozer, textile manufacturer and philanthropist
- Helen Curry (1896–1931), stage actress

== D ==
- Clamma Dale, opera singer
- Edward Darlington, U.S. congressman
- Ben Davis, Major League Baseball player, Philadelphia Phillies sports announcer
- Dux and Julie DeJohn, professional singers

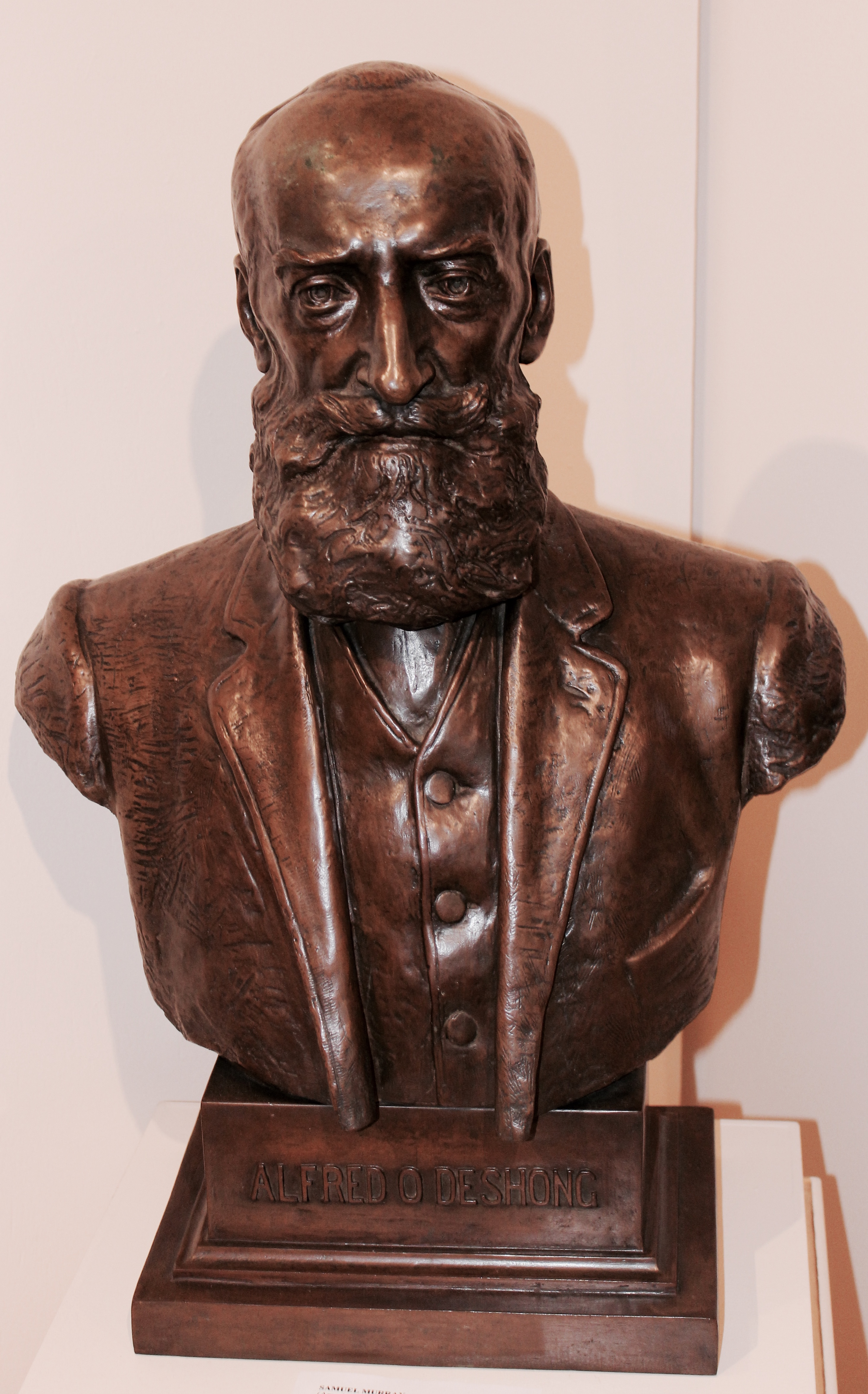
After his death, Alfred O. Deshong, an industrialist, philanthropist, and art collector, left his art collection, mansion and 27-acre estate to the city of Chester.

- Alfred O. Deshong, industrialist, philanthropist, and art collector
- John O. Deshong, businessman and banker
- Peter Deshong, businessman and banker
- Elaine Diacumakos, cell biologist and head of the cytobiology laboratory at Rockefeller University
- Franklin Archibald Dick, Missouri provost marshal general
- Fred Diodati, lead singer of The Four Aces
- Fred Draper, film and television actor
- Kathrynann Durham, Pennsylvania state representative for 160th district (1979–1996), judge on Pennsylvania Court of Common Pleas for Delaware County
- Jill Duson, lawyer, lobbyist and politician in Maine

== E ==
- Samuel Edwards, U.S. congressman
- Carolyn J. Elmore, Maryland state representative
- Frederick K. Engle, rear admiral of the United States Navy
- Theodore Enslin, poet
- David Reese Esrey, businessman and banker

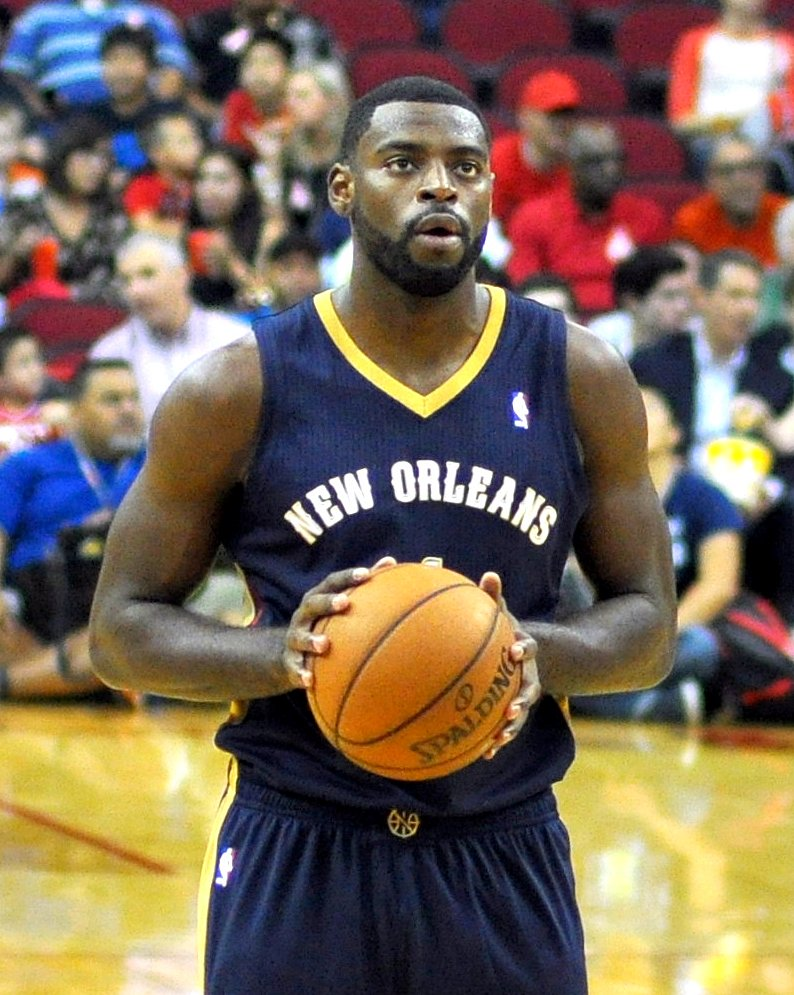
Tyreke Evans, the 4th overall pick in the 2009 NBA draft

- Tyreke Evans, professional basketball player

== F ==
- Bill Fleischman (1939–2019), sports journalist and professor
- Lenora Fulani, psychologist, psychotherapist and political activist

== G ==
- J. R. Gach, talk radio host
- Margaret H. George, Pennsylvania state representative
- Fredia Gibbs, martial artist, kickboxer, boxer
- James Henry Gorbey, United States federal judge and 25th mayor of Chester
- Steve Gordon, screenwriter and film director
- Darrin Govens, professional basketball player
- Bud Grace, cartoonist
- Ralph Greenberg, mathematician
- John E. Gremminger, Pennsylvania state representative
- Frank Hastings Griffin, invented rayon manufacturing process

== H ==
- John K. Hagerty, Pennsylvania state representative for Delaware County (1921–1922), Chester City Council member (1907–1918)

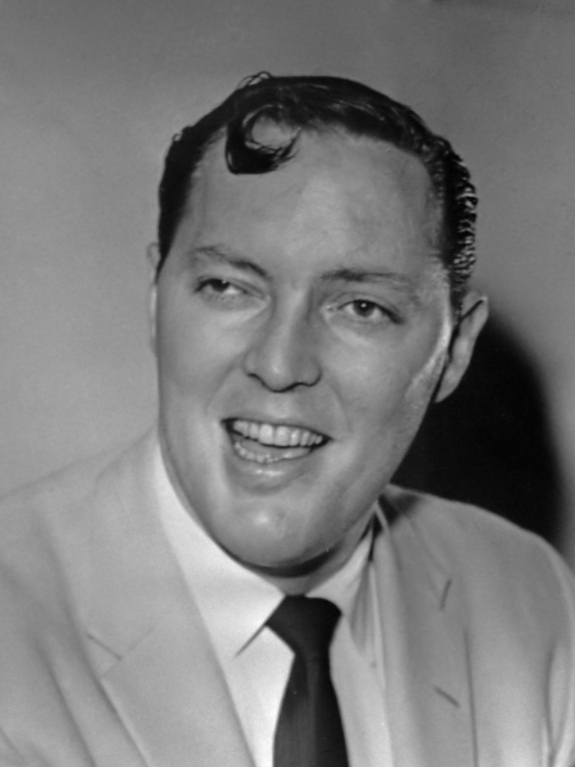
Bill Haley, musical director for radio station WPWA in Chester

- Bill Haley, rock-and-roll musician
- Robert Harland, actor
- Hubert R. Harmon, first superintendent of the United States Air Force Academy
- Herman Harris, professional basketball player
- Evalena Fryer Hedley, journalist, editor, and author
- Ron Henry, professional baseball player
- John B. Hinkson, lawyer, businessman, 6th mayor of Chester
- Rahlir Hollis-Jefferson, professional basketball player
- Rondae Hollis-Jefferson, Toronto Raptors forward
- John Martin Howard, U.S. Navy officer, namesake of mine disposal vessel USS John M. Howard
- Will Hunter, Minnesota Vikings safety and Syracuse University standout

== J ==
- E. W. Jackson, Virginia politician and Christian minister
- Amaire Johnson, record producer and songwriter
- Walter Johnson, electrical engineer
- Derrick Jones Jr., Dallas Mavericks forward
- Edmund Jones, Pennsylvania state representative
- Kevin Jones, Detroit Lions Chicago Bears running back and former Virginia Tech football standout

== K ==
- Carol Kazeem, Pennsylvania state representative
- John Ernst Worrell Keely, con man, inventor of the Keely Motor
- Muhammad Kenyatta, civil rights leader
- Lisa Kereszi, photographer
- Brian Joseph Kirkland, Pennsylvania state representative
- Thaddeus Kirkland, Pennsylvania state representative, 32nd mayor of Chester
- Wilbur Kirkland, professional basketball player
- Joe Klecko, lineman with New York Jets and Temple University; father of Dan Klecko of New England Patriots, Indianapolis Colts, Philadelphia Eagles

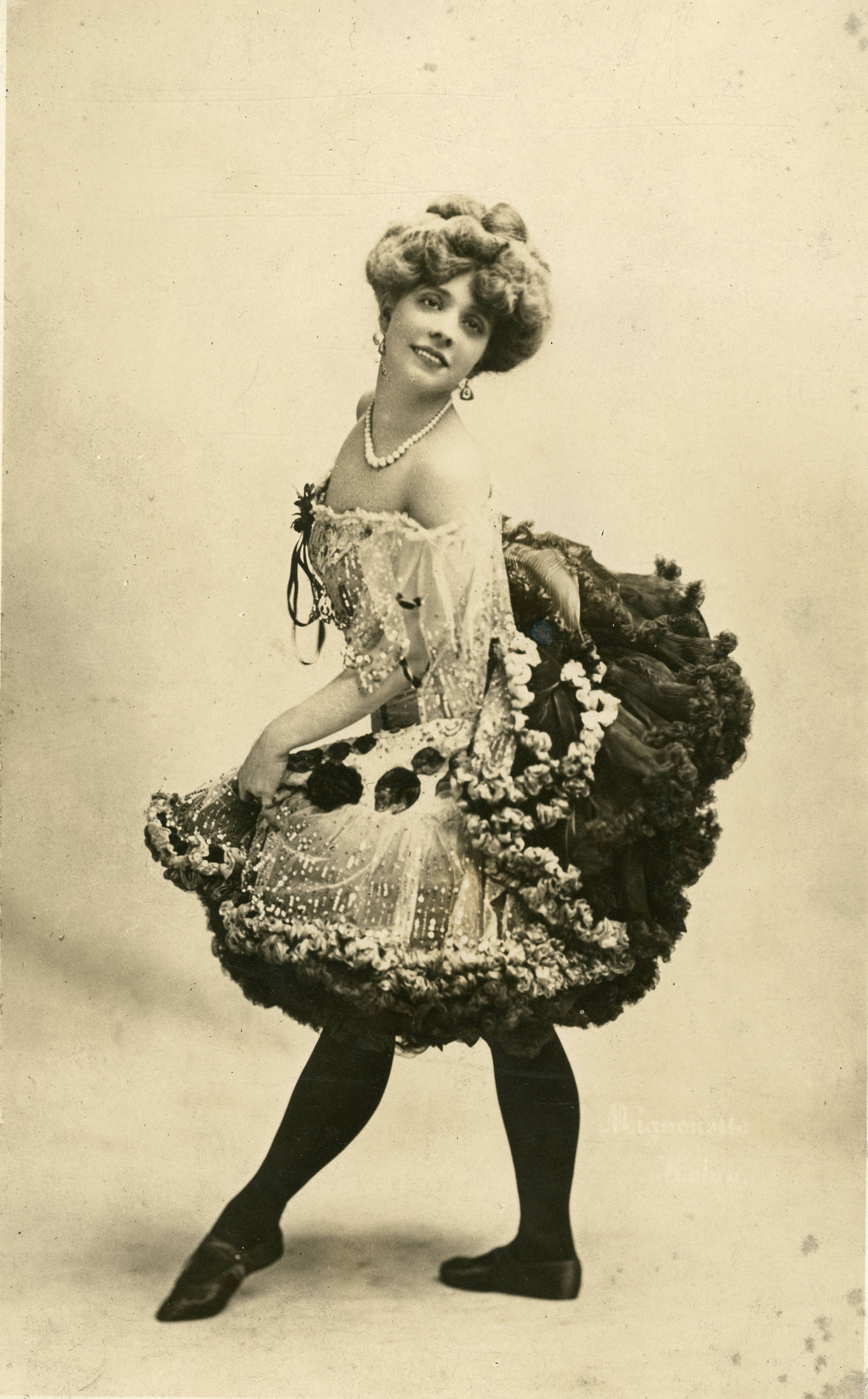
Mignonette Kokin, vaudeville circuit dancer and in Paris, Great Britain and Ireland

- Mignonette Kokin, vaudeville dancer, comedian
- Lew Krausse Jr., professional baseball player
- Bob Kuberski, football player for Green Bay Packers

== L ==
- Bob Lamey, radio announcer, play-by-play announcer for the Indianapolis Colts
- John Larkin, Jr., businessman, banker and first mayor of Chester
- Willie Mae James Leake, first African-American and female mayor of Chester
- John Linder, 31st mayor of Chester
- John Linehan, assistant basketball coach for the Saint Joseph's Hawks
- David Lloyd, attorney general of Pennsylvania, six-term speaker of the Pennsylvania General Assembly, chief justice of the Pennsylvania Supreme Court
- Harry Lyons (1866-1912), professional baseball player

== M ==
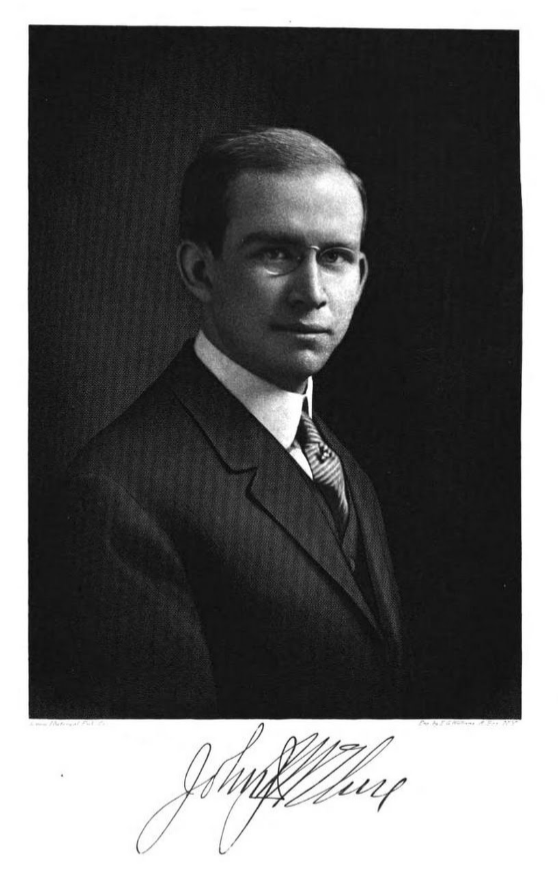
In 1933, Pennsylvania State Senator John J. McClure and 69 associates were found guilty of vice and rum running.

- John J. McClure, Pennsylvania state senator and leader of Delaware County Republican political machine
- Lee McLaughlin, film and television actor
- Kevin Michael, soul singer
- Nicholas K. Miller, middle guard, and defensive MVP for Ohio State Buckeyes
- John Mobley, Denver Broncos linebacker and former Kutztown University of Pennsylvania football standout
- Sylvanus Morley, archaeologist and Mayanist scholar
- Charles Morris, journalist and author
- John Morton, Founding Father of the United States, cast a key vote on the Declaration of Independence, buried in Chester
- Danny Murtaugh, manager of Pittsburgh Pirates who guided team to World Series titles in 1960 and 1971

== N ==
- John H. Nacrelli, 24th mayor of Chester, convicted of racketeering and bribery
- Jameer Nelson, professional basketball player
- Alex North, composer, 15-time Academy Award nominee
- Edward Nothnagle, Pennsylvania state representative for Delaware County (1926–1936), Chester City Council member

== O ==
- Curly Ogden, professional baseball player
- Jack Ogden, professional baseball player
- Donnie Owens, singer, guitarist, producer and composer

== P ==
- John M. Paxton, Jr., United States Marine Corps general officer
- Dominic Pileggi, Pennsylvania state senator
- Johnny Podgajny, professional baseball player
- Rudy Pompilli, saxophonist with Bill Haley and the Comets

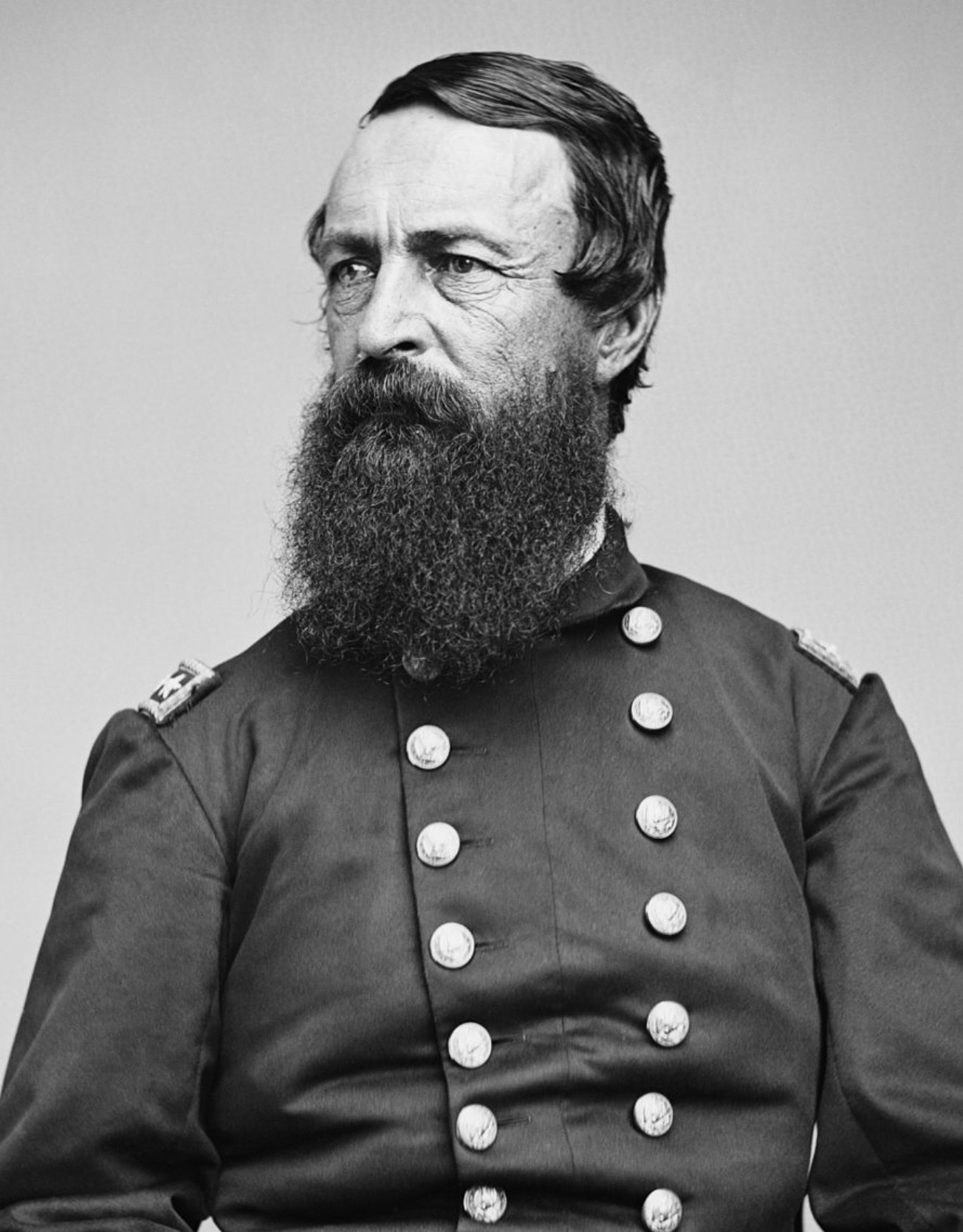
David Dixon Porter served as acting rear admiral in the Union Navy for the Mississippi Squadron during the American Civil War.

- David Dixon Porter, leading officer and reformer in the U.S. Navy during the American Civil War
- William D. Porter, flag officer in the U.S. Navy
- William G. Price Jr., commander of the Pennsylvania National Guard's 28th Infantry Division
- Joe Pyne, radio and TV talk show host
- Caleb Pusey, early settler of Chester, friend and business partner of William Penn

== R ==
- William T. Ramsey, Pennsylvania state representative and 16th mayor of Chester
- George Raymond, president of NAACP Chester branch 1942–1977
- Ronald C. Raymond, Pennsylvania state representative
- Bertice Reading, actress, singer, revue artiste
- James W. Reese, U.S. Army Medal of Honor recipient in World War II
- John Roach, industrialist and shipbuilder
- V. Gilpin Robinson, Pennsylvania state representative
- Stefan Roots, mayor of Chester
- Bo Ryan, former head coach of Wisconsin Badgers men's basketball team, coached UW-Platteville to four NCAA Division III national championships
- Matthew Ryan, singer-songwriter

== S ==
- William I. Schaffer, Pennsylvania attorney general
- Josiah Sleeper, founder of Sleeper's College
- Jerome Smith, professional football player
- James Ross Snowden (1809–1878), 67th speaker of the Pennsylvania House of Representatives, director of the U.S. Mint
- Dawn Sowell, professional track and field athlete
- William Cameron Sproul, 27th governor of Pennsylvania
- Brent Staples, editorial writer for the New York Times
- Joey Stefano, pornographic actor

== T ==
- Robin Toner, national political correspondent for the New York Times
- David Trainer, textile manufacturer and banker
- Ellwood J. Turner, Pennsylvania state representative for Delaware County (1925–1948), 119th speaker of the Pennsylvania House of Representatives (1939–1941)

== W ==
- Horace Walker, professional basketball player
- Young Singleton Walter, Pennsylvania state representative and owner of the Delaware County Republican newspaper
- William Ward, U.S. congressman
- William Ward Jr., Pennsylvania State Representative and two-term mayor of Chester

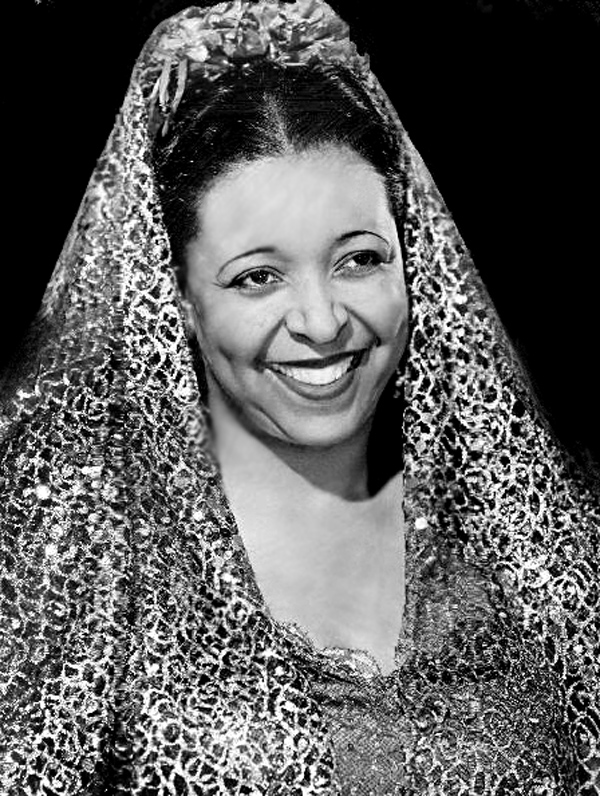
Ethel Waters, the first African-American to star in her own television show

- Ethel Waters, Grammy-winning blues recording artist, Broadway performer, Academy Award nominee for Pinky (1949)
- George Watkins, U.S. congressman
- Brandi Wells, singer-songwriter
- Eleanor D. Wilson, Tony-nominated actress and artist
- Stephen M. Wolownik, Russian and Eastern European musician
- Jonathan Edwards Woodbridge, shipbuilder and naval architect
- Thomas Worrilow, Pennsylvania state representative
- Robert C. Wright, Pennsylvania state representative
