= Walter Craig =

Walter Craig may refer to:

- Walter Craig (American football), American football coach
- Walter Early Craig (1909–1986), United States federal judge
- Walter Craig (sportsman) (1846–1923), English cricketer and tennis player
- Walter Craig (actor), American actor
- Walter Craig (mathematician) (1953–2019), Canadian mathematician
- Walter F. Craig (1854–1933), New York City violinist and conductor
- Walter H. Craig (1880–1937), Pennsylvania state representative
