= Chester High School (Chester, Pennsylvania) =

Public school in Pennsylvania, United States

Coordinates: 39.8506°N 75.3673°W

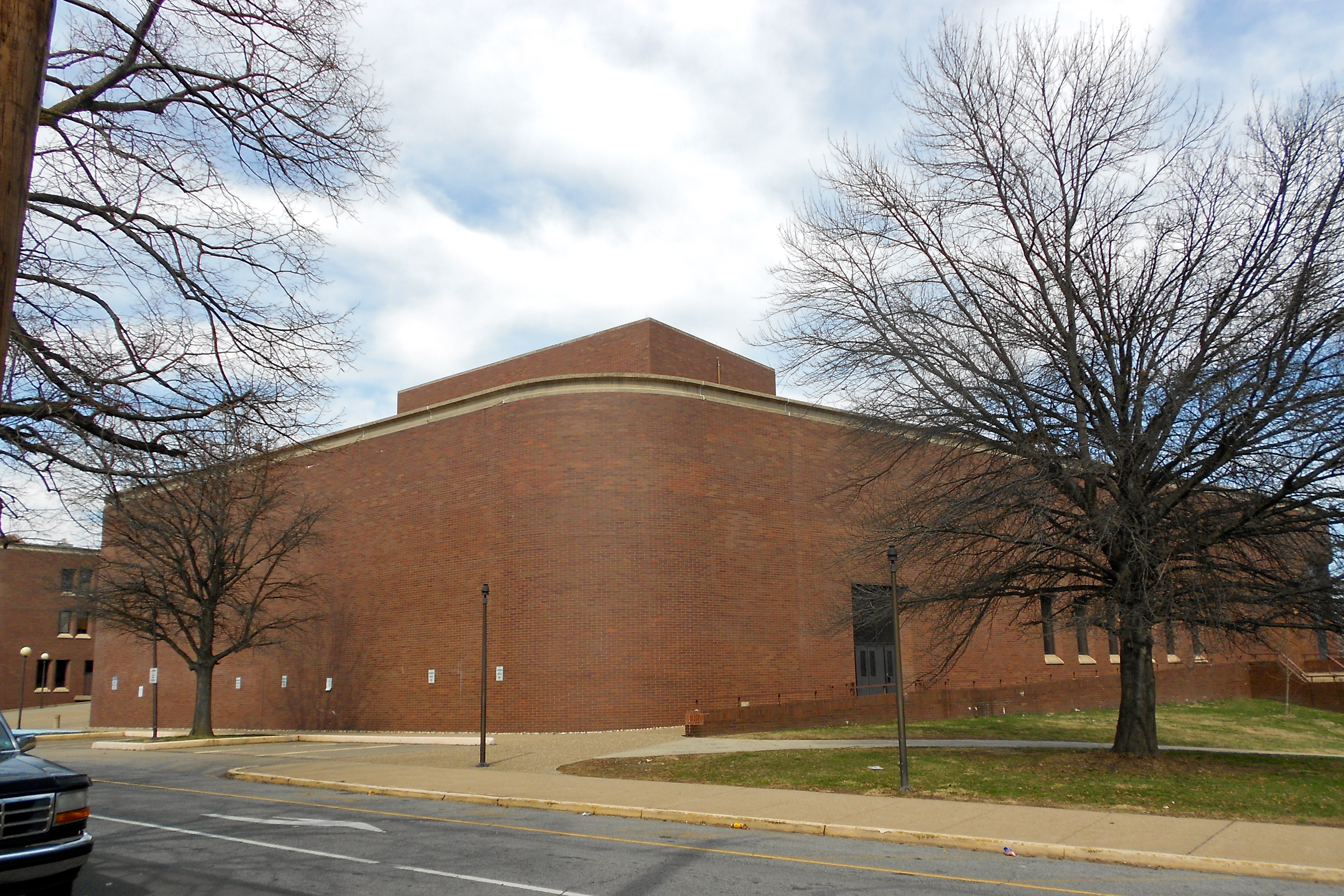
- 232 W 9th Street; Chester, PA 19013

Information
- Type: Public
- Motto: C-Pride In Pursuit of Excellence
- Principal: Pearl Cameron
- Teaching staff: 56.00 (FTE)
- Grades: 9-12
- Enrollment: 863 (2023–2024)
- Student to teacher ratio: 15.41
- Colors: Orange and Black
- Mascot: Clipper
- Website: https://chs.chesteruplandsd.org/

Chester High School is an urban, public high school located in Chester, Delaware County, Pennsylvania, United States, with a ZIP code of 19013-4288. Chester is a part of the Chester-Upland School District. The school serves the City of Chester, Chester Township, and Upland. In 2018–2019, the school had 994 pupils.

== History ==
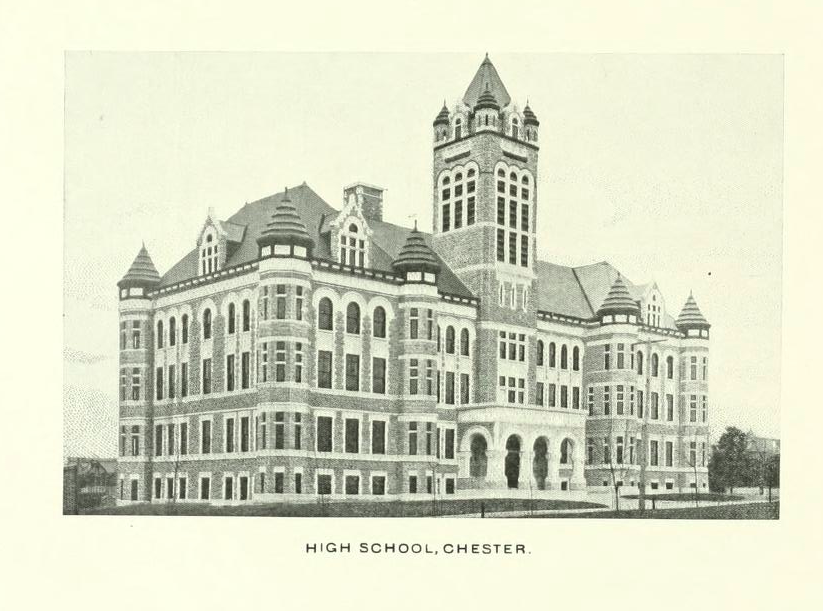
Sketch of Chester High School from John Jordan's History of Delaware County, and its people, 1914

The first Chester High School building was erected in 1902.

== Extracurriculars ==
The district offers a wide variety of clubs, activities and sports. Sports programs include; football, basketball, volleyball, cheerleading, baseball, tennis, track and club activities. This school has a long-standing tradition of Championship wins in basketball. The Clippers have won eight state championships: 1983, 1989, 1994, 2000, 2005, 2008, 2011 and 2012. Chester was state runner-up in 1954, 1955, 1957, 1959, 1966, 1967, 1972, 2003, 2007 and 2013. Since the 1981-82 season, Chester has qualified for the state tournament every year except for 1991-92.

== Notable alumni ==
- Louis A. Bloom, Pennsylvania State Representative for Delaware County (1947-1952), Judge of the Pennsylvania Court of Common Pleas, Delaware County
- Ethel Hampson Brewster, philologist and professor at Swarthmore College
- E. Wallace Chadwick, U.S. Representative from Pennsylvania
- Tom Chism, professional baseball player
- Walter H. Craig, Pennsylvania State Representative for Delaware County (1923-1925)
- Bill Cottrell, NFL player
- Ted Cottrell, NFL player and coach
- Clamma Dale, operatic soprano
- John V. Diggins, former Delaware County Court president judge
- Tyreke Evans, Guard, Memphis Grizzlies
- Negley Farson, author and journalist
- Lenora Fulani, psychologist, psychotherapist and political activist
- Fredia Gibbs, Martial artist, kickboxer, boxer
- Darrin Govens, Guard, St. Joseph University
- Talib Rasul Hakim, classical composer
- Herman Harris, professional basketball player
- Ron Henry, professional baseball player
- Rahlir Hollis-Jefferson, professional basketball player for the Saint John Mill Rats of the NBL
- Rondae Hollis-Jefferson, professional basketball player for the Brooklyn Nets
- Will Hunter, Safety, Minnesota Vikings
- Thaddeus Kirkland, Pennsylvania State Representative and Mayor of Chester
- Wilbur Kirkland, professional basketball player
- Lew Krausse Jr., professional baseball player
- Albert Dutton MacDade, Pennsylvania State Senator and Judge in the Delaware County Court of Common Pleas
- Howard Meeks, bishop in the Episcopal Church
- Danny Murtaugh, professional baseball player, coach and manager
- Jameer Nelson, Guard, Orlando Magic and St. Joseph's University
- Alex North (class of 1927), composer
- Curly Ogden, professional baseball player
- Jack Ogden, professional baseball player
- Johnny Podgajny, professional baseball player
- Joe Pyne, controversial talk show host from the 1950s and 1960s
- George Raymond, president of the NAACP Chester branch from 1942 to 1977
- Stefan Roots, Mayor of Chester, Pennsylvania
- Bo Ryan, Men's Basketball Coach, University of Wisconsin–Madison
- Dawn Sowell, professional Track and Field athlete
- William Cameron Sproul, 27th Governor of Pennsylvania
- Ellwood J. Turner, Pennsylvania State Representative for Delaware County (1925-1948), 119th Speaker of the Pennsylvania House of Representatives (1939-1941)
- Horace Walker, former NBA Forward
- William Ward Jr., Pennsylvania State Representative and two term mayor of Chester
- Robert C. Wright, Pennsylvania State Representative
