= List of mayors of Chester, Pennsylvania =

The Mayor of Chester is the chief executive of the government of the city of Chester, Pennsylvania as stipulated by the city charter. This article is a listing of past (and present) mayors of Chester.

On March 5, 1795, the borough of Chester, which had been governed under the charter granted by William Penn in 1701, was incorporated by the Pennsylvania Assembly. Chester was incorporated as a city on February 4, 1866 with a mayor-council government system, consisting of a popularly elected city mayor and city council. The terms of the mayor and city council members are four years.

== Mayors (1866–present) ==
Mayor	Term	Political party	Notes
John Larkin, Jr.	1866–1872	Republican	Larkin was the first mayor of Chester and refused to accept any salary for his service as mayor
Dr. J.L. Forwood	1872–1881	Democrat	
James Barton, Jr.	1881–1884	Republican	
Dr. J.L. Forwood	1884–1887	Democrat	
Major Joseph R. T. Coates	1887–1893	Republican	Coates was an officer in the 1st Pennsylvania Reserve Regiment of the Union Army during the U.S. Civil War and served in several of the key battles of the war.
John B. Hinkson	1893–1896	Democrat	
Crosby M. Black	1896–1899	Republican	Black served as a Pennsylvania State Representative from 1905 to 1906
Dr. Daniel W. Jefferis	1899–1902	Republican	
Howard H. Houston	1902–1905	Republican	
William H. Berry	1905–1905	Democrat	Berry was elected Pennsylvania State Treasurer in the fall of 1905 and resigned as mayor in Dec. 1905
Samuel E. Turner	1906–1906	Republican	Elected by Chester City Council to fill Berry's term
Dr. Samuel R. Crothers	1906–1908	Republican	
David M. Johnson	1908–1911	Republican	
William Ward Jr.	1911–1915	Republican	This was Ward's 1st of two terms as mayor
Wesley S. McDowell	1916–1920	Republican	McDowell ordered all hotels, pool halls and liquor stores closed, implemented a curfew after dark and forbade the carrying of weapons in order to quell the 1917 Chester race riot
William T. Ramsey	1920–1924	Republican	Ramsey served as a Pennsylvania State Representative from 1913 to 1920
Samuel E. Turner	1924–1931	Republican	
T. Woodward Trainer	1931–1932	Republican	Resigned. Appointed Clerk of House of Representatives, Harrisburg, Pennsylvania January 3, 1939
William Ward Jr.	1932–1939	Republican	This was Ward's 2nd of two terms as mayor
Clifford H. Peoples	1939–1945	Republican	
Ralph S. Swarts	1944–1956	Republican	Originally appointed on January 5, 1943, to replace Mayor Peoples. Ran unopposed in November 1943
Joseph L. Eyre	1956–1963	Republican	Eyre was a direct descendant of John Larkin, Jr., the first mayor of Chester.
James Henry Gorbey	1964–1967	Republican	Gorbey became a judge for the Delaware County Court of Common Pleas and a federal judge for the United States District Court of Eastern Pennsylvania
John H. Nacrelli	1968–1979	Republican	Nacrelli was convicted of federal bribery and racketeering charges related to his activities as mayor and served two years in prison
Joseph F. Battle Jr.	1979–1986	Republican	Battle was nominated to the Delaware County Court of Common Pleas in 1987 by Robert P. Casey
Willie Mae James Leake	1986–1991	Republican	Leake was Chester's first female mayor and first African-American mayor
Barbara Bohannan-Sheppard	1992–1995	Democrat	First African-American Democratic mayor. Bohannan-Sheppard created a major controversy by hiring a convicted murderer and rapist as her administrative assistant
Dr. Aaron Wilson Jr.	1996–1998	Republican	Wilson resigned to take a seat on the Pennsylvania state Public Utility Commission
Dominic F. Pileggi	1999–2002	Republican	Pileggi became a Pennsylvania State Senator for the 9th Senatorial District and a Judge for the Pennsylvania Court of Common Pleas
Wendell Butler Jr.	2002–2012	Republican	Butler served as police chief of Chester for 10 years as well as two terms as Mayor
John Linder	2012–2016	Democrat	2nd African-American Democratic mayor
Thaddeus Kirkland	2016–2024	Democrat	Kirkland was a member of the 159th District of the Pennsylvania House of Representatives for 23 years
Stefan Roots	2024–present	Democrat	Roots was a member of the Chester City Council from 2022 to 2024
