= Wendell Butler Jr. =

American politician

Mayor of Chester, Pennsylvania
- In office October 9, 2002 – January 4, 2012
- Preceded by: Dominic F. Pileggi
- Succeeded by: John Linder

Police Commissioner of Chester
- In office January 1996 – October 9, 2002

Personal details
- Born: 1943 or 1944 (age 81–82) Chester, Pennsylvania, U.S.
- Party: Republican
- Spouse: Tanya Butler
- Children: 3

Wendell Butler Jr. (born 1943/1944) is a former American politician who served as a Republican mayor of Chester, Pennsylvania, from 2002 to 2012.

== Biography ==
Butler was born and raised in Chester, where he lived in a federal housing project and attended Chester Public schools. He moved to Ridley Township while a junior in high school and graduated in 1962 from Ridley High School. He served in the U.S. Army for three years before returning to Chester, where he worked for American Viscose Corporation in Marcus Hook, Pennsylvania. In 1969, he joined the Chester Police force. In 1989, he was promoted to sergeant, and in 1994 he was promoted to major as part of the command staff. In January 1996, he was named by Mayor Aaron Wilson Jr. as police commissioner.

On October 9, 2002, the city council appointed him as mayor to complete the term of fellow Republican Dominic F. Pileggi, who was named to replace State Senator Clarence D. Bell, who had died in office. He won re-election to two additional terms after his appointment. In 2010, he implemented a state of emergency and nighttime curfew after a spate of murders, including the killing of 2-year-old Terrance Webster.

In the 2011 Chester Mayoral election, he lost his bid for re-election to Democrat John Linder ending long-time Republican control of the Chester government. There had previously been one Democratic mayor, Barbara Bohannan-Sheppard, since 1905.

In 2015, he unsuccessfully ran again for mayor against Democratic candidate Thaddeus Kirkland, who had defeated Linder in the primary. In 2012, he was named by the Delaware County Council to serve a five-year term on the board of the Chester Water Authority.

== Personal life ==
Butler is married to Tanya Butler; they have two children, Dondi, and Dirk. Butler also has an older daughter from a previous marriage, Elaine.

== See also ==
- List of mayors of Chester, Pennsylvania

Political offices
Preceded by Dominic F. Pileggi	Mayor of Chester, Pennsylvania; 2002–2012	Succeeded by John Linder
