= John Linder (Pennsylvania politician) =

American politician

Mayor of Chester, Pennsylvania
- In office January 3, 2012 – 2016
- Preceded by: Wendell Butler Jr.
- Succeeded by: Thaddeus Kirkland

Member of the Chester City Council from the at-large district
- In office January 4, 2010 – January 3, 2012
- Preceded by: Willie Wells
- Succeeded by: William Jacobs

Personal details
- Born: 1947 (age 78–79)
- Party: Democratic
- Education: Widener University; Kutztown University
- Occupation: Politician, Professor

John A. Linder is an American politician who served as a Democratic member of the Chester City Council from 2010 to 2012 and Mayor of Chester, Pennsylvania from 2012 to 2016.

== Education and professional career ==
Linder received his BA in Behavioral Sciences from Widener University, and M.Ed. from Kutztown University.

Linder worked as an instructor and counsellor at Kutztown University from 1976 to 1980. From 1980 to 1989, Linder served as assistant director of the Human Services Program at the Alexandria Campus of Northern Virginia Community College, while concurrently holding the rank of assistant professor in Human services at the college. He has been a Master Trainer and an Associate of the Carkhuff Institute of Human Technology, specializing in Interpersonal Skills Training for teachers, counselors and other human services personnel. Linder also served as a professor of political science at Delaware County Community College.

== Political career ==
=== 2008 Pennsylvania Senate campaign ===
In 2008, Linder challenged incumbent Republican State Senator Dominic Pileggi for his seat. Pileggi, who was seeking his second full term in the Senate, was also the body's Majority Leader. On election day, Pileggi defeated Linder by about sixteen percentage points, or 22,000 votes.

=== Chester City Council ===
On November 3, 2009, Linder was elected to an at-large seat on the Chester City Council on a ticket with Portia West. West and Linder defeated Republican Fred Pickett and Marsha Taylor, with Democrats gaining two formerly Republican seats. Linder was the top vote-getter in the race.

=== Mayor of Chester ===
In the 2011 Chester Mayoral election, Linder defeated longtime incumbent Republican Mayor Wendell Butler Jr. in a hotly contested race. With his election, Linder became just the second Democrat to hold the office since 1905, and the first since Barbara Bohannan-Sheppard left office in 1995. His election was part of a broader sea change in city politics, with Democrats ending Republican dominance over Chester government.

Following his swearing-in, Linder announced his retirement from his teaching position, a move allowing him to focus on his duties as Mayor full-time. He was also appointed Director of the City Department of Public Affairs, which oversees Chester's police department. In March 2012, Linder was appointed to the White House's Strong Cities, Strong Communities (SC2) initiative, under the purview of the Department of Housing and Urban Development.

Butler lost his bid for re-election to Thaddeus Kirkland in the 2015 Democratic primary.

== See also ==
- List of mayors of Chester, Pennsylvania

Political offices
Preceded by Willie Wells	Councilman Chester City Council; 2010–2012	Succeeded by William Jacobs
Political offices
Preceded by Wendell Butler Jr.	Mayor of Chester; 2012–2016	Succeeded by Thaddeus Kirkland
