= Dominic F. Pileggi =

American politician

Dominic Pileggi
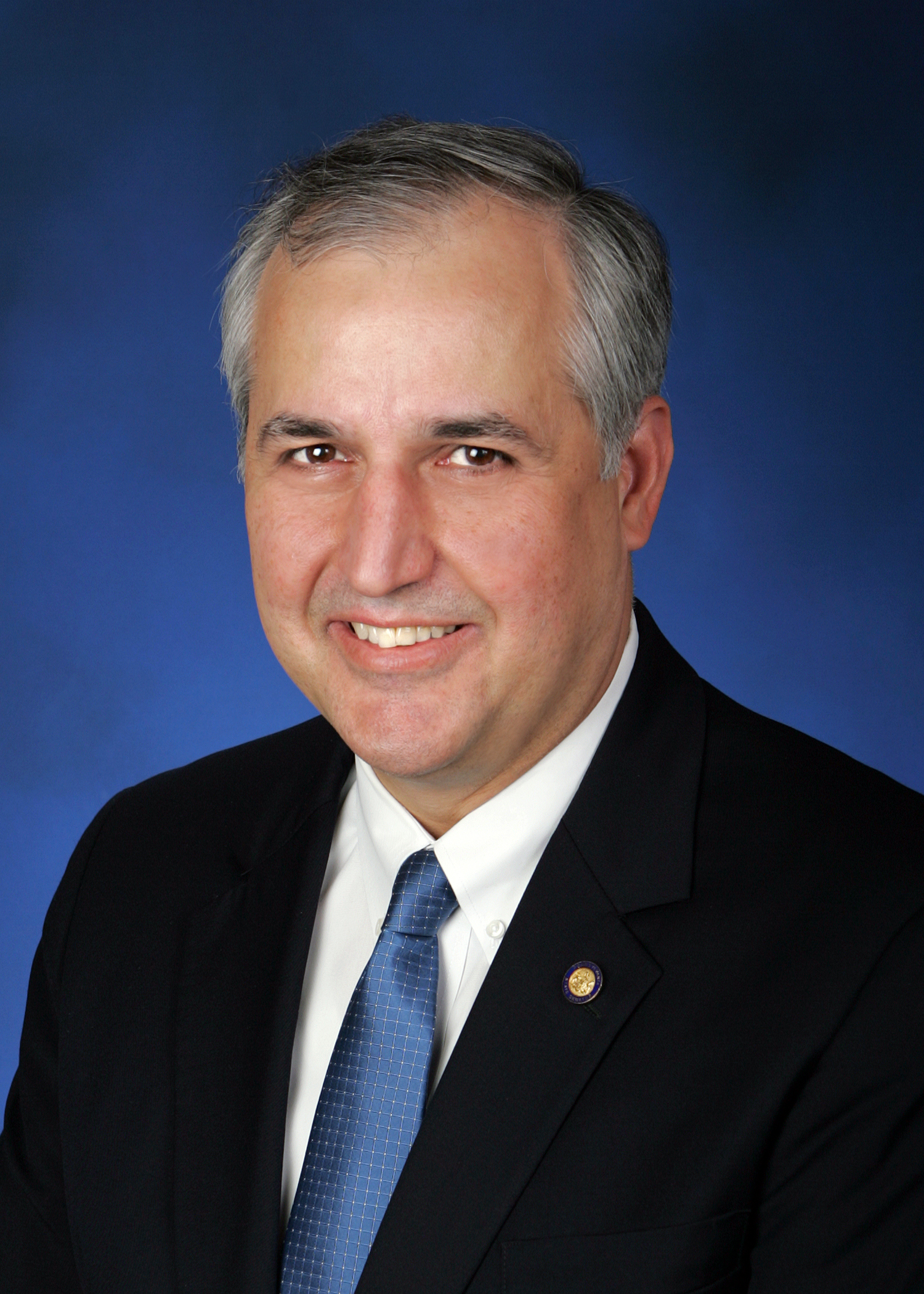

Judge of the Delaware County Court of Common Pleas
- Incumbent
- Assumed office January 4, 2016

Republican Leader of the Pennsylvania Senate
- In office January 2, 2007 – November 30, 2014
- Preceded by: David Brightbill
- Succeeded by: Jake Corman

Member of the Pennsylvania Senate from the 9th district
- In office October 16, 2002 – January 3, 2016
- Preceded by: Clarence Bell
- Succeeded by: Thomas Killion

Mayor of Chester, Pennsylvania
- In office January 1999 – October 9, 2002
- Preceded by: Aaron Wilson Jr.
- Succeeded by: Wendell Butler Jr.

Personal details
- Born: December 15, 1957 (age 68) Chester, Pennsylvania, U.S.
- Party: Republican
- Spouse: Diana Pileggi
- Education: Saint Joseph's University (BA); Villanova University (JD)

Dominic F. Pileggi (born December 15, 1957) is an American politician and judge from Pennsylvania who served as Republican mayor of Chester, Pennsylvania from 1999 to 2002 and as a member of the Pennsylvania 9th Senatorial district from 2002 until January 2016. He was elected judge in the Pennsylvania Court of Common Pleas, Delaware County in 2015.

== Early life, education, and law career ==
Pileggi was born in Chester, Pennsylvania and graduated from Archmere Academy, a private Roman Catholic college preparatory school located in Claymont, Delaware. He obtained a B.A. in economics from Saint Joseph's University in 1979 and a J.D. from Villanova University School of Law in 1982.

== Mayor of Chester ==
Prior to his election to the state Senate, Pileggi served as mayor of Chester, Pennsylvania from 1999 to 2002.

== Pennsylvania Senate ==
=== Elections ===
Pileggi ran in a special election on October 1, 2002 to fill the seat of State Senator Clarence Bell, who died on July 26, 2002. He defeated State Representative Thaddeus Kirkland, 60%-21%. In 2004, Pileggi won a full term to his seat, defeating Thomas Bosak 60%-40%. In 2008, Pileggi won re-election to his second full term, defeating John Linder 58%-42%. In 2012, he won re-election to his third full term, defeating Patricia Worrell, 55%-45%.

=== Tenure ===
Pileggi was sworn in on October 16, 2002. In 2003, the political website PoliticsPA named him to "The Best of the Freshman Class" list.

Leadership

After the shakeup in leadership caused in part by the 2005 legislative pay raise, Pileggi was elected by his colleagues to serve as the Republicans' floor leader in November 2006. He was re-elected to serve as Republican floor leader in November 2008, November 2010 and November 2012.

Pileggi was Chairman of the Rules and Executive Nominations Committee. He was also a member of the Appropriations Committee, the former Chairman of the Urban Affairs and Housing Committee, and a former member of the State Planning Board, which develops recommendations for state policies and actions regarding conservation and land use issues.

Efforts to increase Senate transparency

One of his first acts as floor leader was to introduce a set of new rules for the Senate which increased the public's ability to review Senate actions. The new rules, embodied in Senate Resolution 5, require amendments to be posted online before a vote is taken, require all roll call votes from the Senate floor to be posted online within 24 hours, require committee votes to be posted online within 48 hours, require the Senate to wait at least six hours before voting on an amended bill, require the Senate's Legislative Journal to be posted online within 45 days, and limit session times to between 8 a.m. and 11 p.m. Pileggi said the new rules "will enable people to more easily track our actions and to determine how their Senator is representing them."

Pennsylvania's Open Records Law

In the 2007-08 legislative session, Pileggi was the prime sponsor of Senate Bill 1, which rewrote Pennsylvania's Open Records Law for the first time in more than 50 years. SB 1 was signed into law by Gov. Ed Rendell on February 14, 2008, and is now known as Act 3 of 2008.

Pileggi's Senate Bill 1 flipped the presumption of government records in Pennsylvania, so that all records are presumed to be available for public inspection and a government agency which wants to prevent access must prove that they are legally permitted to do so. In the past, records were presumed to be closed, and citizens had to prove that they were legally permitted to access them. The new law also created an Office of Open Records, allowing disputes to be resolved without going to court. After the bill was passed, Pennsylvania Newspaper Association President Tim Williams said, "PNA specifically recognizes the leadership of Sen. Pileggi on Senate Bill 1 and praises his commitment to fairness and government accountability."

Other legislative initiatives

Pileggi was the prime sponsor of Senate Bill 1100, which transferred approximately $17 million to Pennsylvania's Hazardous Sites Cleanup Act (HSCA) Fund out of legislative accounts, ensuring that the HSCA Fund could meet its obligations in the 2007-08 fiscal year. The bill also earmarked funding through 2010–11. After being signed by Gov. Ed Rendell on December 18, 2007, SB 1100 is now known as Act 77 of 2007.

Legislation drafted by Pileggi to criminalize the practice of recruiting members, particularly children, into criminal street gangs, was signed into law by Governor Tom Corbett in October 2012.

== Judge in Delaware County ==
In November 2015, Pileggi was one of three individuals elected to serve as a Judge on the Pennsylvania Court of Common Pleas in Delaware County.

== See also ==
- List of mayors of Chester, Pennsylvania

Political offices
Preceded by Aaron Wilson	Mayor of Chester, Pennsylvania; 1999–2002	Succeeded by Wendell Butler Jr.
Pennsylvania State Senate
Preceded by Clarence Bell	Member of the Pennsylvania Senate from the 9th district 2002–2016	Succeeded by Tom Killion
Party political offices
Preceded by David Brightbill	Republican Leader of the Pennsylvania Senate; 2007–2014	Succeeded by Jake Corman
