= Mark T. Smith =

American painter (born 1968)

- Born: 1968 (age 57–58); Wilmington, Delaware
- Education: Pratt Institute
- Occupation: Painter
- Years active: 1990–present
- Website: www.marktsmith.com

Mark T. Smith (born 1968) is an American painter.

== Early life and education ==
Smith is an American painter known for his vibrant, intricate artworks that blend traditional techniques with contemporary influences. Born in Wilmington, Delaware, Smith attended Archmere Academy, before moving to New York City in 1986 to study at the Pratt Institute in Brooklyn. His education at Pratt honed his figure-drawing skills and deepened his understanding of what it means to be an artist.

== Career ==
After graduating from Pratt Institute, Smith quickly established himself with his first commission—a limited-edition poster for Walt Disney Company in Orlando. In New York City, he gained recognition for his paintings, animations, and design work. His corporate patrons included MTV, Pepsi, the New York Knicks, Rolling Stone, Sony, UB40, Chrysler, Showtime, Nickelodeon, and VH-1. Eventually, his illustration work was represented by Richard Solomon Artists Representative.

In 1996, Smith gained national attention with the "Absolut Smith" campaign for Absolut Vodka. In 2003, he created three paintings—Drive Thru Man, Mothman, and Empty—for Taco Bell, which were reproduced on stretched canvas to decorate the chain's restaurants. Several copies of these works were stolen, later appearing on resale platforms such as eBay and other online marketplaces. Interest in Smith's Taco Bell paintings has surged in recent years, with a growing cult following. The artwork continues to be stolen from remaining locations where it is still displayed and has been recreated in the Metaverse.

In 2002, he hand-painted a pair of PT Cruisers. One auctioned for the charity Operation Smile and another exhibited at the Cannes Film Festival, now part of the Walter P. Chrysler Museum's permanent collection.

In 2008, the United States Olympic Committee commissioned Smith to create a dragon painting for the Beijing Summer Olympics, which was displayed in the Olympic Village.

In 2009, Smith was selected as the first artist to participate in "Paint on Pink," an initiative repurposing materials from Brad Pitt’s Make It Right Foundation New Orleans project. The sale of his artwork supported post-Hurricane Katrina recovery efforts. During this time, Smith also expanded his work into sculpture, producing numerous pieces in steel and a series of editioned works reproduced in Parian. His work was exhibited at major art fairs across the United States, including Art Chicago, Art Miami, and Palm Beach Contemporary.

Smith stopped exhibiting publicly between 2014 and 2023, maintaining a private studio practice throughout that period. In 2023, he returned to full-time creative work and is scheduled to have his first solo exhibition in Orlando at Mills Gallery in May 2025.

== Teaching and lecturing ==
Smith has contributed to academia throughout his career. He taught at Parsons School of Design for eleven years and at Pratt Institute for two years. Additionally, he has lectured at institutions such as the University of the Arts, Vanderbilt University, the University of Delaware, the Cleveland Institute of Art, and the Savannah College of Art and Design (SCAD).

== Influences and style ==
Smith's artistic style has been compared to Jean-Michel Basquiat and Willem de Kooning. His work integrates elements of graffiti art, hip-hop culture, and advertising. His Taco Bell paintings, in particular, were a homage to Maxfield Parrish.

== Selected commissions and exhibitions ==
- Taco Bell (2003): Mark T. Smith Official
- MTV Commissions: YouTube
- UB40 Album Cover (2017): Mark T. Smith Official
- Valley Bank Mural: Valley Bank
- Arbor Foundation Commission (2022): Mark T. Smith Official
- Taschen Publishing Illustration: Mark T. Smith Official
- Lighthouse Exhibition (2020): Mark T. Smith Official
- Miami Art Fair Week (2014): Mark T. Smith Official
