= Archmere Academy =

Catholic school in Delaware, US

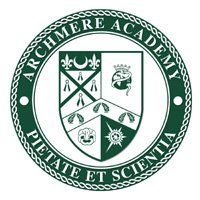
- Archmere Academy school crest

Location
- 3600 Philadelphia Pike; Claymont, New Castle County, Delaware 19703; United States; 39°48′07″N 75°27′18″W

Information
- Type: Private; College-preparatory; Catholic school
- Motto: Pietate et Scientia (Faith and Knowledge)
- Religious affiliation: Catholic Church (Norbertine)
- Established: 1932 (94 years ago)
- CEEB code: 080010
- Principal: Katie Eissler
- Head of School: Dan Hickey
- Grades: 9-12
- Gender: Co-ed
- Enrollment: 469 (2026–27)
- Average class size: 15
- Student to teacher ratio: 9:1
- Colors: Green and white
- Mascot: Great auk
- Nickname: Auks
- Accreditation: Middle States Association of Colleges and Schools
- Publication: Tapestry
- Newspaper: The Green Arch
- Yearbook: The Patio
- School fees: technology: $550 books: $200–$300 uniforms: $150–$250
- Tuition: Approximately $36,950
- Website: www.archmereacademy.com

Archmere Academy is a private Catholic college preparatory school in Claymont, Delaware, United States. 469 students were enrolled for the 2026–27 academic year. The academy is co-educational and independent, though located within the Diocese of Wilmington.

== History ==
Archmere Academy was founded in 1932 by the Norbertines, initially as an all-boys school. It began on the former estate of U.S. industrialist John J. Raskob, who lived there with his wife Helena and their 12 children until 1931. Raskob was the campaign manager for New York Governor Al Smith during his presidential campaign in 1928 and the home was used for many meetings, including those of the Democratic National Committee.

The estate was purchased by Bernard Pennings in 1932. He was the Abbot of the Norbertine Order and is attributed as the founder of St. Norbert College, a private Catholic liberal arts college located in De Pere, Wisconsin. The estate was purchased for $300,000 in the spring of 1932 and officially dedicated in the fall of 1932. The first year of operation, Archmere Academy had an enrollment of 22 students, 16 freshmen and 6 sophomores. In 1933 and 1934, enrollment grew to 50 students and 72 students respectively.

Archmere Academy begun its slow expansion during the mid to late 1930s due to enrollment increases. Minor expansions were made to accommodate boarding students. In 1939 it built its first gymnasium and by 1940 it had converted the manor on the property into a science center. The school made a transition in the mid-1940s by where it became strictly a four-year college preparatory institution. It phased out both 7th and 8th grades during the 1946–47 and 1947-48 school years. It continued as a day school and boarding school for boys while its enrollment continued to increase.

In 1957, Archmere Academy celebrated its 25th anniversary with the groundbreaking for St. Norbert Hall, the school's main academic building, which was completed in 1959. Going into the 1960s, it continued to expand to accommodate the increase in enrollment, which had reached 394 students by the end of that decade. The Justin E. Diny Science Center was opened in 1973 with classrooms for physics, chemistry, biology, and environmental science. The old science center was turned into a center for the arts which held classes for the school's chorus, band, theater, and studio arts program.

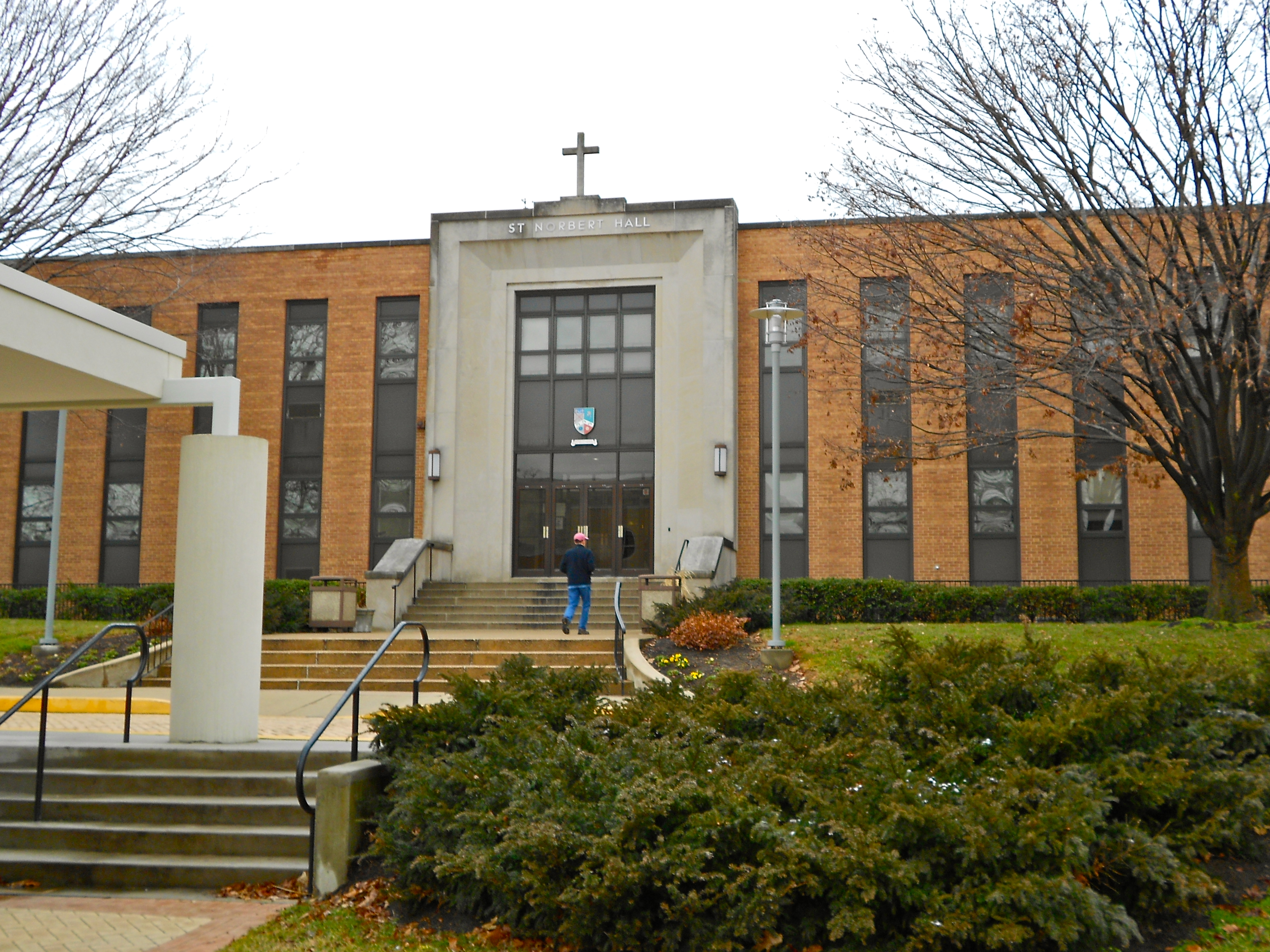
St. Norbert Hall, the center of academic life at Archmere

The 1970s brought about two major changes for Archmere Academy. It moved away from being a boarding school and became a day school exclusively. In 1975 it also announced the decision to become a co-ed institution, enrolling 50 girls into the school. It was near the end of the 1970s that a board of trustees was for the academy, with the first meeting taking place in 1980. The board has been credited with expanding the curriculum and extracurricular activities at the academy as well as further expanding to accommodate the new programs. One expansion included a renovation of St. Norbert Hall which included an addition to the current building. Additional expansion in the early 1980s included a new auditorium that seated 750 people, as well as a new library constructed on campus.

In April 2001, an internal dispute among the Norbertines relating to the establishment of Claymont Priory separate from Daylesford Abbey spilled over into the administration of Archmere Academy. Interventions from alumni calmed the turmoil and resulted in the academy taking control of the former Raskob residence, known as "the Patio." 2003 marked the beginning of the academy's "building on mission & heritage" campaign that included goals to complete the Justin E. Diny Science Center expansion, the construction of a student life center, and renovations to the athletic field.

The school broke tradition with the installation of a non-Norbertine headmaster when Dr. Michael Marinelli, a 1976 graduate of Archmere Academy, took over at the beginning of 2010.

Towards the end of the 2015–16 academic school year, Archmere began massive renovations on Saint Norbert's Hall. This reconstruction made changes to the library and every room in the building.

=== Architecture ===
- Archmere
- U.S. National Register of Historic Places
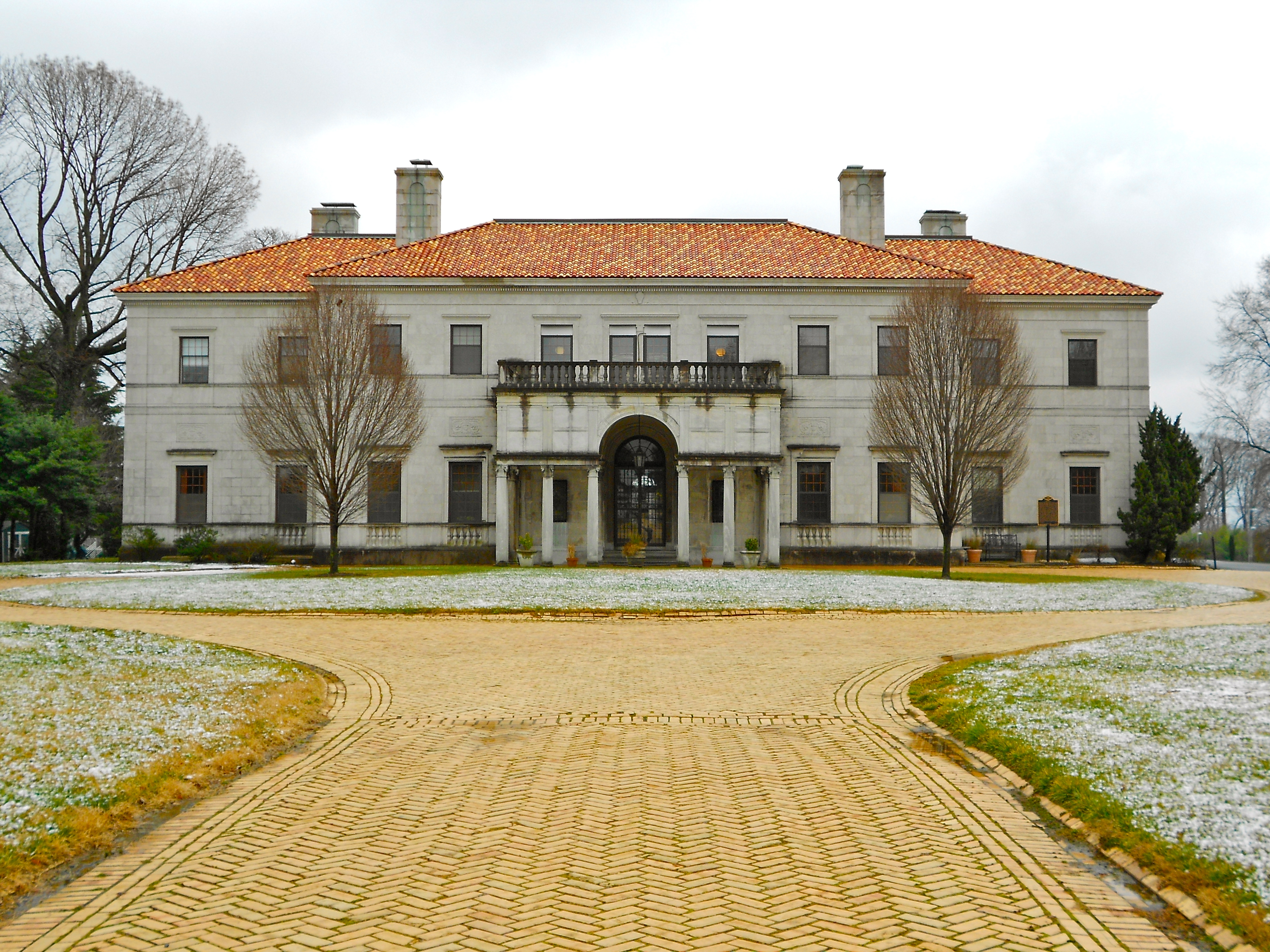
- The Patio, country estate of John J. Raskob

- Location within Delaware
- Location: 3600 Philadelphia Pike, Claymont, Delaware
- Coordinates: 39°48′08″N 75°27′13″W
- Area: 15 acres (6.1 ha)
- Architect: Harper, Alexander James; McCure, Clay
- Architectural style: Renaissance, Italian Renaissance
- NRHP reference No.: 92001143
- Added to NRHP: September 9, 1992 (34 years ago)

The Patio, one of the buildings of Archmere Academy, was built between 1916 and 1918 and was originally used as the country estate of John J. Raskob and his wife. Raskob was a financier, the developer of the Empire State Building, and a previous chairman for the Democratic National Committee. The name "Archmere" was given to the estate because of the natural arch of the trees formed over the Delaware River vista. The original building that Raskob constructed, also known as the Patio, was placed on the National Register of Historic Places in 2007. In 2009, the Delaware Public Archives dedicated Archmere Academy with a historical marker.

== Academics ==
Archmere offers a large number of AP courses, including Spanish, French, statistics, calculus (both AB and BC), physics, chemistry, biology, environmental science, art portfolio in 2-D and 3-D, computer science, English composition, US history, European history, and world history.

=== Music program ===
The music program at Archmere Academy is an elective program that focuses on performance practices from the Renaissance to the 20th century including jazz and Broadway. Instruction is provided mostly through rehearsal experience although there is a course on music theory for advanced students as well as a songwriting course. Performing groups include the jazz ensemble, concert choir, stage band, and Mastersingers. The Mastersingers was founded in 1988 and consists of 30 students selected by audition at the beginning of the school year. In addition to performing at school liturgies and community concerts, they compete nationally and internationally. The academy also has a partnership that allows student musicians to study with the Serafin String Quartet.

== Athletics ==
Archmere competes in the Diamond State Conference for interscholastic sports such as American football, field hockey, basketball, rugby, soccer, swimming, diving, lacrosse, volleyball, golf, tennis, cheerleading, baseball, softball, cross country, track and field and wrestling.

Archmere's campus has two artificial turf fields (used by American football, M/W soccer, M/W lacrosse and field hockey), a baseball field (upgraded with dugouts), a softball field (upgraded with dugouts), six tennis courts and a running track.

== Notable alumni ==
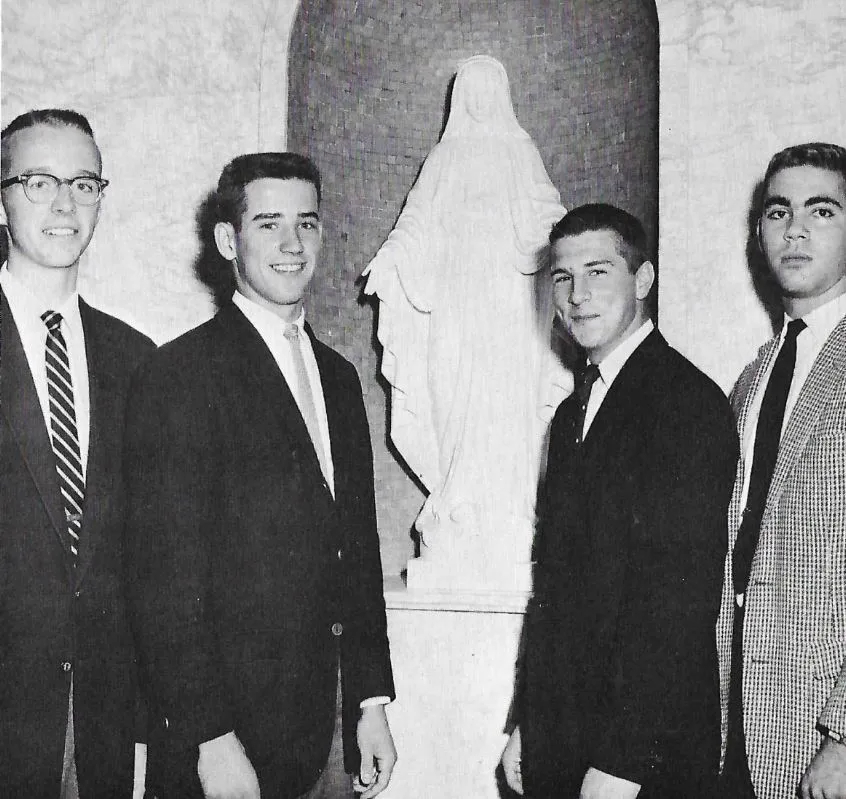
Joe Biden '61, second from left, at Archmere Academy

- Joe Biden (1961) – 46th President of the United States from 2021 to 2025; 47th Vice President of the United States from 2009 to 2017; six-term United States Senator from Delaware from 1973 to 2009
- Colm Connolly (born 1964), Chief United States District Judge
- Thomas Capano (1967) – former deputy attorney general of Delaware and murderer
- Dominic Pileggi (1975) – politician from Pennsylvania, state senator
- Stefan Roots, Mayor of Chester, Pennsylvania
- William H. Green (1979) – chemical engineer, MIT professor
- Mark T. Smith (1986) – painter
- Beau Biden (1987), former Delaware Attorney General; son of Joe Biden '61
- Hunter Biden (1988) – lawyer and lobbyist; son of Joe Biden '61
- Erin Arvedlund (1988) – financial journalist
- Meagan Miller (1992) – American soprano, opera singer
- Tom Coyne (1993) – writer; associate professor of English at Saint Joseph's University
- Ashley Biden (1999) – activist, daughter of Joe Biden '61
