= John Martin Howard =

U.S. Navy Mine Disposalman (1917-1942)

- Born: August 20, 1917; Chester, Pennsylvania, U.S.
- Died: June 11, 1942 (aged 24); Corton, Suffolk, U.K.
- Burial place: Buried at sea
- Military career
- Allegiance: United States
- Branch: United States Navy
- Rank: Ensign
- Memorials: Plaque in St. Nicolas minister church in Great Yarmouth, England; Listed on the Tablet of the Missing at the Cambridge American Cemetery and Memorial

John Martin Howard (20 August 1917 – 11 June 1942) was a United States Navy officer from Pennsylvania who served during World War II as a Naval mine disposalman. He died along with Lcdr. Roy Berryman Edwards in a naval mine explosion while observing the disarming of a German mine that washed ashore in England. Howard was the first U.S. Navy mine disposal personnel killed in the war. Howard and Edwards were recognized in a special plaque in the St. Nicolas minister church in Great Yarmouth, England and the USS John M. Howard (IX-75) was named in Howard's honor.

== Early life ==
Howard was born in Chester, Pennsylvania. He was a graduate of Media High School and studied at Admiral Farragut Academy, the U.S. Naval Academy, and Swarthmore College. He enlisted in the United States Naval Reserve on 22 June 1935. In June 1937 he reported to the Naval Academy but resigned on February 7, 1939. He was behind in his studies and was recommended to be dropped, but was allowed to resign. After the completion of training from 1940-1941 at the Naval Reserve Midshipman's School, Howard was appointed Ensign on 28 February 1941.

On March 7, 1941, Howard graduated from the third class at the Advanced Mine School, later renamed the Mine Disposal School at the Naval Gun Factory (Washington Naval Yard). Howard was among the select members of that class that were sent to England to observe and gain experience with the Royal Navy and Royal Engineers in mine disarming and disposal. He was assigned to the Royal Navy shore establishment, H.M.S. Mirtle, in an abandoned quarry designated a Mine Investigation Range where enemy mines and other ordinance were brought to be examined in detail.

== Naval mine accident ==
A German moored magnetic mine, TMA-1 came ashore at Corton Sands, England and Lcdr. Roy Berryman Edwards, RN, DSO, BEM took the assignment to disarm the mine. Howard was to observe the operation. Edwards requested permission from the Admiralty in London to go ahead as he had successfully disarmed a similar mine earlier but was told to await an officer with current intelligence on German mines. Edwards called again asking permission as he felt fully qualified and, on 11 June proceeded with Howard observing. Observers on the cliff, at a safe distance, observed Edwards removing the mechanism plate with Howard close by. The mine's 470 lb charge detonated killing Howard and Edwards and scattered debris for two hundred yards in each direction along the beach. Ensign Howard was the first U.S. Navy mine disposal person killed.

Investigation by the officer intended to assist, if Edwards had waited, revealed that the mine did not have a new anti-tampering device, but an old and previously unknown one. The U.S. Navy Bomb Disposal Intelligence Bulletin published 1 November 1944 noted that regardless of mechanical events "the fact remains that the tragedy can be definitely and directly attributed to an utter disregard for established and proven RMS Procedure."

== Legacy ==
Howard was buried at sea and is commemorated on the Tablets of the Missing at the Cambridge American Cemetery and Memorial in Coton, Cambridgeshire, England. Both Howard and Edwards were commemorated on a special plaque in the St. Nicholas minster church in Great Yarmouth, England.

The USS John M. Howard (IX-75) was named in his honor.
