= Ethel H. Brewster =

American professor (1886–1947)

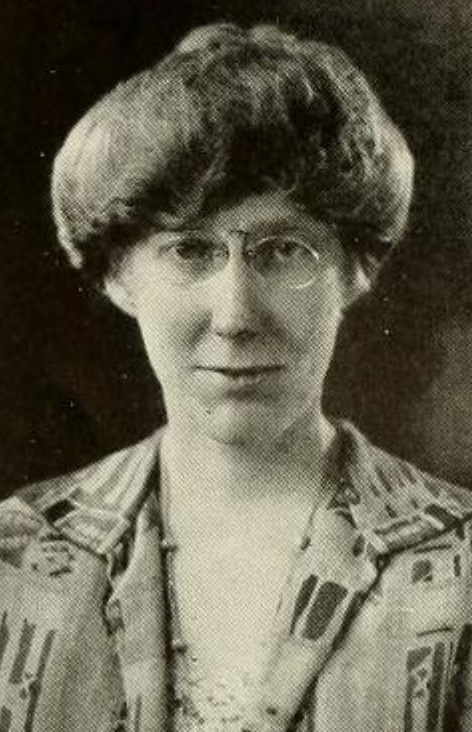
- Brewster, from the 1926 yearbook of Swarthmore College
- Born: Ethel Hampson Brewster; July 3, 1886; Chester, Pennsylvania, U.S.
- Died: August 18, 1947 (aged 61); Great Neck, New York, U.S.
- Occupations: Professor of Greek and Latin, Swarthmore College (1916–1947)

Ethel H. Brewster (July 3, 1886 – August 18, 1947) was an American college professor and philologist. She was Dean of Women (effective 1932) and taught Greek and Latin at Swarthmore College, where she was a member of the faculty from 1916 to 1947.

== Early life and education ==
Ethel Hampson Brewster was born in Chester, Pennsylvania, the daughter of Joseph Fergus Brewster and Jane (Hampson) Brewster. She graduated from Chester High School in 1903. Her father was a direct descendant of Mayflower passenger William Brewster (Mayflower passenger). She earned a bachelor's degree from Swarthmore College in 1907, and a master's degree from the University of Pennsylvania in 1911. She held the Bennett Fellowship in Classics from 1912 to 1914, and completed doctoral studies at Penn in 1915, with a dissertation titled "Roman Craftsmen and Tradesmen of the Early Empire".

== Career ==
Brewster taught Latin, French and English at Chester High School after she graduated from Swarthmore in 1907. She taught Latin at Vassar College from 1914 to 1916, and became associate professor of Greek and Latin at Swarthmore College in 1916. She taught at Swarthmore for over thirty years, and was department chair, Dean of Women and acting Dean of the college during her Swarthmore years.

In 1919, she addressed an audience at the Philadelphia High School for Girls, saying "It is as stupid to oust ancient history from the schools in favor of American and modern European history as it would be to knock out the first two stories of a skyscraper and expect the structure to stand."

Brewster was a member of Phi Beta Kappa and the American Association of University Women.

== Publications ==
Brewster's work was published in academic journals, including Classical Philology, The Classical Weekly, The Journal of Higher Education, and The Classical Journal.

- "On Suetonius, De grammaticis 5" (1915)
- "The Synthesis of the Romans" (1918)
- "The Functions of a Teacher" (1923)
- "Modern Antiquities" (1920)
- "Experiments with Translations" (1924)
- "Social Life as an Academic Problem" (1924)
- "A Weaver of Oxyrhynchus: Sketch of an Humble Life in Roman Egypt" (1927)
- "Reading for Honors" (1930)
- A Weaver's Life in Oxyrhynchus: His Status in the Community (1931)
- "In Roman Egypt" (1935)
- "Poster Politics in Ancient Rome and in Later Italy" (1944)
- "The Place of Latin in the Post-War Curriculum" (1946)

== Personal life ==
Brewster died, unmarried, at her niece's home in 1947, at the age of 61, in Great Neck, New York. Her body was found in a closet, with a bottle of sleeping pills, after she had reportedly expressed concern over her declining health.
