= Lawrence A. Conner Sr. =

American politician (1899–1964)

Member of the Pennsylvania House of Representatives from the Delaware County district
- In office 1953–1954
- Preceded by: Louis A. Bloom
- Succeeded by: Peter J. Murphy

Personal details
- Born: August 22, 1899 Chester, Pennsylvania, U.S.
- Died: May 21, 1964 (aged 64) Lima, Pennsylvania, U.S.
- Resting place: St. Thomas the Apostle Church Cemetery, Glen Mills, Pennsylvania, U.S.
- Party: Democratic

Lawrence A. Conner Sr. (August 22, 1899 – May 21, 1964) was an American politician from Pennsylvania who served as a Democratic member of the Pennsylvania House of Representatives for Delaware County from 1953 to 1954.

== Early life and education ==
Conner was born in Chester, Pennsylvania, and attended parochial school and business college.

== Career ==
Conner served as chief clerk and chief deputy United States Marshal for the eastern district of Pennsylvania and as chief fire examiner for the Pennsylvania Insurance Department.

Conner served as chair of the Chester City Democratic Committee. He was elected to the Pennsylvania House of Representatives for Delaware County and served from 1953 to 1954. He had an unsuccessful campaign for reelection to the House in 1954 and 1960.

He had unsuccessful campaigns for mayor of Chester and for city councilman. He served as Democratic leader for the 7th Ward.

Conner died in Lima, Pennsylvania and is interred at St. Thomas the Apostle Church Cemetery in Glen Mills, Pennsylvania.
