= USS John M. Howard =

History

United States
- Name: John M. Howard
- Namesake: John Martin Howard
- Builder: Mathis Yacht Building Company
- Yard number: 219
- Launched: 1934 as Elsie Fenimore
- Completed: 1934
- Acquired: 2 July 1942
- Commissioned: 1 September 1942
- Decommissioned: 9 May 1945
- Fate: Returned to Maritime Commission
- Notes: Official Number 233593

General characteristics
- Displacement: 94 tons
- Length: 87 ft (27 m)
- Beam: 20 ft (6.1 m)
- Speed: 9 knots

USS John M. Howard (IX-75), previously the yacht Elsie Fenimore, was an unclassified miscellaneous vessel, and the only ship of the United States Navy to be named for John Martin Howard.

Ensign Howard, USNR, graduated from the third class at the Advanced Mine School, later Mine Disposal School, and was sent to England to observe and gain experience with Royal Navy and Royal Engineers in mine disarming and disposal. He was the first Navy mine disposal person killed when, on 11 June 1942, he was observing Lcdr. Roy Berryman Edwards, RN, DSO, BEM defusing a German TMA-1 magnetic influence naval mine that detonated on Corton sands near Lowestoft. The detonation left nothing but scattered debris from sea to cliffs and two hundred yards in each direction along the beach.

The vessel was engaged in documenting enemy ordinance, particularly mines, with assignment to the Explosives Investigation Laboratory (EIL), Naval Ordnance Laboratory, Washington, D.C. The vessel operated in nearby waters and along the Atlantic coast.

== Yacht Elsie Fenimore ==
The vessel was built for Eldridge Reeves Fenimore Johnson by Mathis Yacht Building in Camden, New Jersey with completion in 1934 as Elsie Fenimore. This was the second Johnson yacht bearing the name, with the first having been completed by the same yard (hull number 193, official number 227907) in 1928.

Johnson, son of Eldridge R. Johnson (founder and president of the Victor Talking Machine Company) and Elsie Reeves Fenimore Johnson, had served during World War I at the Field Artillery Officers' School and subsequently as superintendent of the company's Experimental Department. In the year prior to the launch of his yacht, Elsie Fenimore, he had helped prepare and then participated in the 1933 Johnson-Smithsonian Deep-Sea Expedition aboard his father's yacht Caroline. He founded a research enterprise and combined his interests in yachting, exploration and science with cruises of his yacht. He was also involved with the University of Pennsylvania Museum and the Academy of Natural Sciences of Philadelphia, with collections at those institutions benefiting from cruises of Elsie Fenimore.

== War service ==
Johnson's World War II involvement at the least paralleled that of his yacht. In June 1942 he joined the United States Naval Reserves with service in the Mines Countermeasures Section, Research Division, Bureau of Ordinance until 1944 when he went to the General Ordinance School then the David W. Taylor Model Basin. His work was associated with underwater explosion testing and underwater photography. On 2 July 1942 the Navy purchased the yacht from Johnson and placed it in service at Philadelphia, Pennsylvania, on 29 July. On 17 August 1942, in Washington, DC, Elsie Fenimore was renamed John M. Howard and commissioned 1 September 1942 with assignment to the Explosives Investigation Laboratory (EIL), renamed December 1944 as Ordnance Investigation Laboratory (OIL), located at Stump Neck, Maryland. (Note: A peninsula on the Potomac River between Mattawoman Creek and Chickamuxen Creek south of Indian Head, Maryland) under the Naval Ordnance Laboratory, Washington, DC, (At the time headquartered at the Naval Gun Factory, later White Oak, Maryland). The laboratory was responsible for receiving enemy ordinance, performing inerting and then documenting the ordinance and procedures to strip and disarm the weapons. As part of the studies the facility used special X-Ray examination with a one million volt Vandergraf X-Ray machine in a specially built building.

John M. Howard was assigned to conduct explosive experiments at the laboratory. About June 1943 the ship was moved to Mayport Florida. The ship was used for ordnance experiments in the Potomac River, Chesapeake Bay and various Atlantic coast ports.

John M. Howard decommissioned on 9 May 1945 at the Washington Navy Yard and was placed in service until 16 November 1945. She was returned to the Maritime Commission for disposal 24 January 1946.

== Post war ==
The vessel was returned to the owner and resumed the name Elsie Fenimore with Johnson engaged in even more photographic and scientific work. Between 1947 and 1951 that work extended from Labrador to the Gulf of Mexico with a focus on water transparency, though other data was collected.

The vessel was registered in 1959 by the Philadelphia Council of the Boy Scouts of America as the John M. Howard. It subsequently became the Earl of Desmond, Northern Light, Caroline Rose and Kick Back. In an announcement dated 2018 the charter and tour company Windy Venue, operating in New York City, noted they were acquiring Kick Back on the west coast and refitting the vessel as Elsie Fenimore. The vessel was neglected, but found to be sound condition with original diesels still operative.

== See also ==
- Naval EOD Technology Division
