= Josiah Sleeper =

Josiah Sleeper (18??–1946) was an American businessman who founded Sleeper's College (sometimes referred to as Sleeper's Business College) in Chester, Pennsylvania, in 1910.

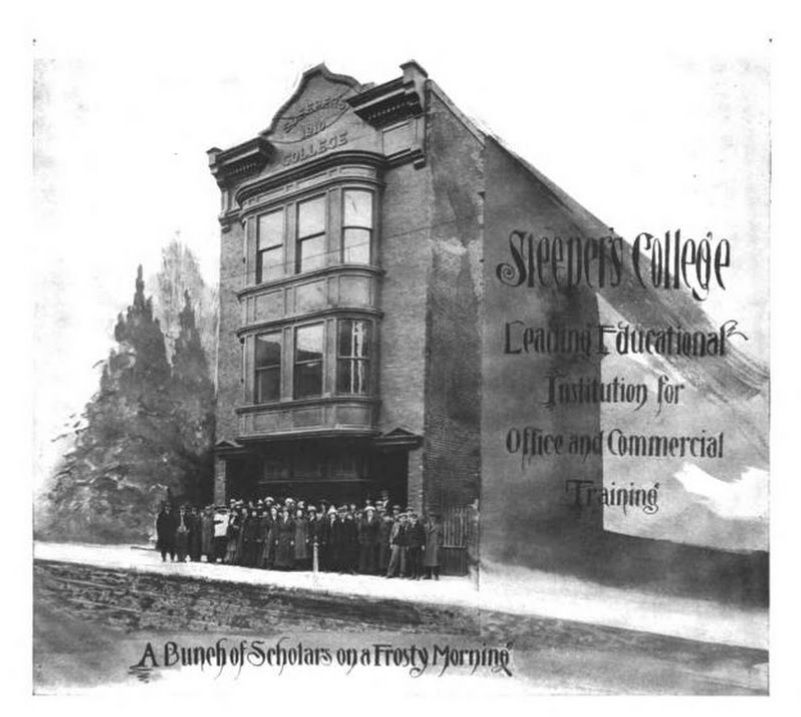
Sleeper's College

Sleeper attended grammar, or perhaps high school, at The Old Academy, located on West 2nd Street between Fulton and Franklin Streets in Chester.

Sleeper became well known in Delaware County. In the 1890s, he had at least partial control of a baseball team in Marcus Hook, some three miles southwest of Chester. He brought the team to Chester's 12th Street Park, which was bounded by 12th, Upland and Potter Streets. He eventually passed control of the team to local baseball impresario Jesse Frysinger, and it moved in 1900 to Wilmington, Delaware.

In October 1921, Sleeper bought part of the "Brow O' the Hill" estate at 8 Irving Road, Wallingford, Pennsylvania, from D. Edwin Irving for $4,250. He acquired the rest on March 18, 1930, from Samuel Lloyd Irving and his wife and Jeanette Irving Stull and her husband.

Sleeper died August 20, 1946. His will allowed his sister, Lottie Sleeper Hill, to live in "Brow O’ the Hill" until her death. But she had, in fact, already died and so the property was sold for $43,000 ($693,357 today) to James H. Gorbey, who would go on to be mayor of Chester (1964 to 1967) and U.S. District Court judge from 1970 until his death in 1977.

Sleeper was a member of the Rotary Club and donated funds to support the Josiah Sleeper Award for recognition of patriotic service of foreign born Americans.
