= Louis A. Bloom =

American politician

Member of the Pennsylvania House of Representatives from the Delaware County district
- In office 1947–1952
- Preceded by: George F. Dougherty
- Succeeded by: Lawrence A. Conner, Sr.

Personal details
- Born: August 15, 1900 Russia
- Died: December 18, 1988 (aged 88) Lansdowne, Pennsylvania, U.S.
- Resting place: Ohev Shalom Cemetery, Brookhaven, Pennsylvania, U.S.
- Party: Republican

Louis A. Bloom (August 15, 1900 – December 18, 1988) was an American politician from Pennsylvania who served as a Republican member of the Pennsylvania House of Representatives for Delaware County from 1947 to 1952. He was a judge in the Pennsylvania Court of Common Pleas for Delaware County.

== Early life and education ==
Bloom was born in Russia and graduated from Chester High School in Chester, Pennsylvania, in 1918. He graduated from the Wharton School at the University of Pennsylvania in 1922 and the University of Pennsylvania Law School in 1925.

== Career ==
Bloom worked as an attorney-at-law and as Assistant District Attorney for Delaware County for 16 years. He was elected to the Pennsylvania House of Representatives for Delaware County and served from 1947 to 1952. He was not a candidate for reelection for the 1953 term.

Bloom was elected treasurer and solicitor for Chester, Pennsylvania. He was elected judge for the Pennsylvania Court of Common Pleas for Delaware County in 1965.

Bloom served as president of the advisory board for the Pennsylvania State University Delaware County campus from 1968 to 1987.

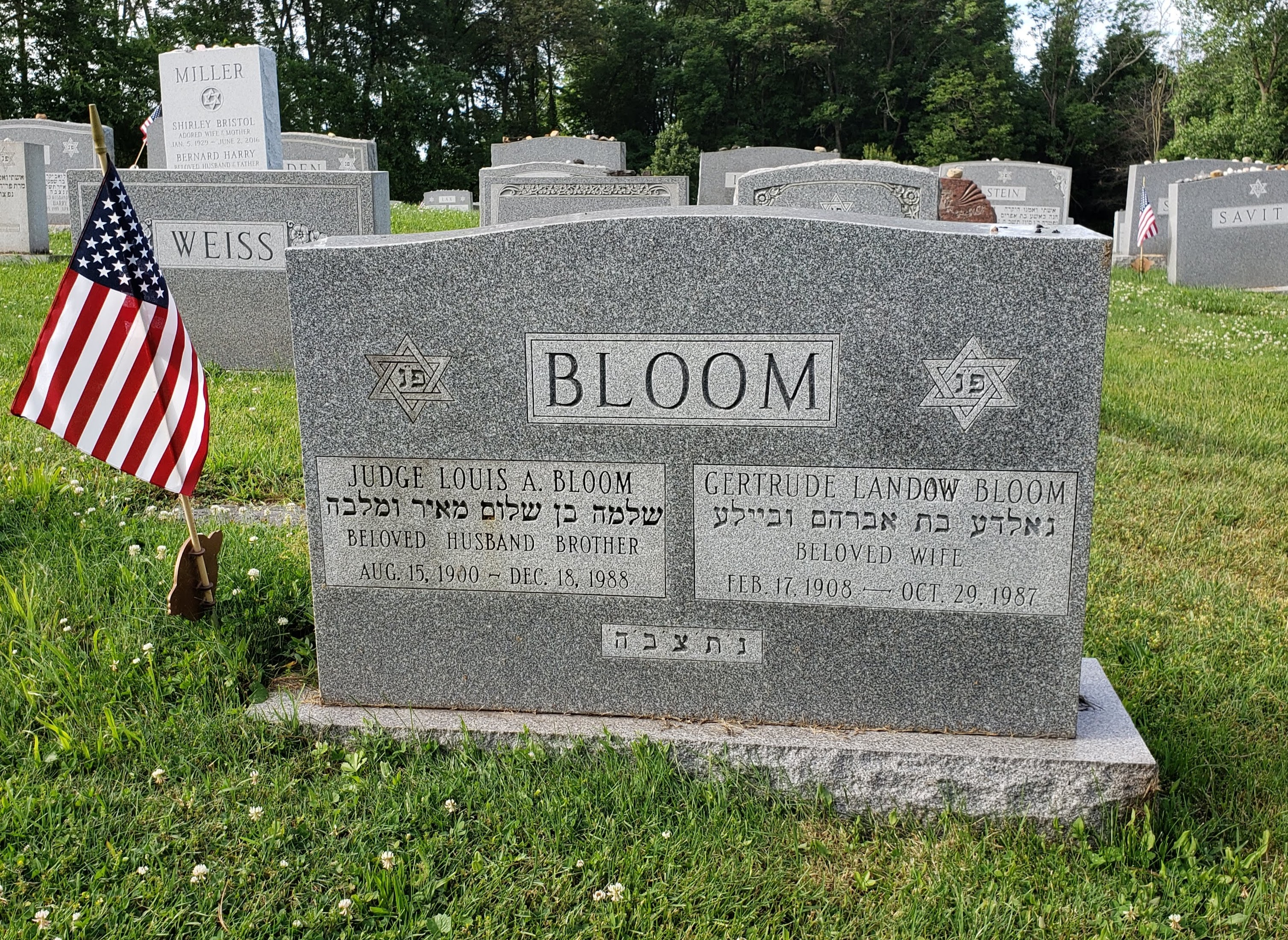
Louis A Bloom gravestone

Bloom died in Lansdowne, Pennsylvania, and was interred at the Ohev Shalom Cemetery in Brookhaven, Pennsylvania.

== Legacy ==
The Judge Louis A. Bloom Scholarship was established at the Pennsylvania State University Brandywine Campus in honor of Bloom.

== Personal life ==
Bloom was married to Gertrude Landow Bloom. He was a member of Chester Post #134 of the Jewish War Veterans of the United States.

Pennsylvania House of Representatives
Preceded by George F. Dougherty	Member of the Pennsylvania House of Representatives, Delaware County; 1947–1952	Succeeded by Lawrence A. Conner, Sr.
