= Mignonette Kokin =

American singer and dancer

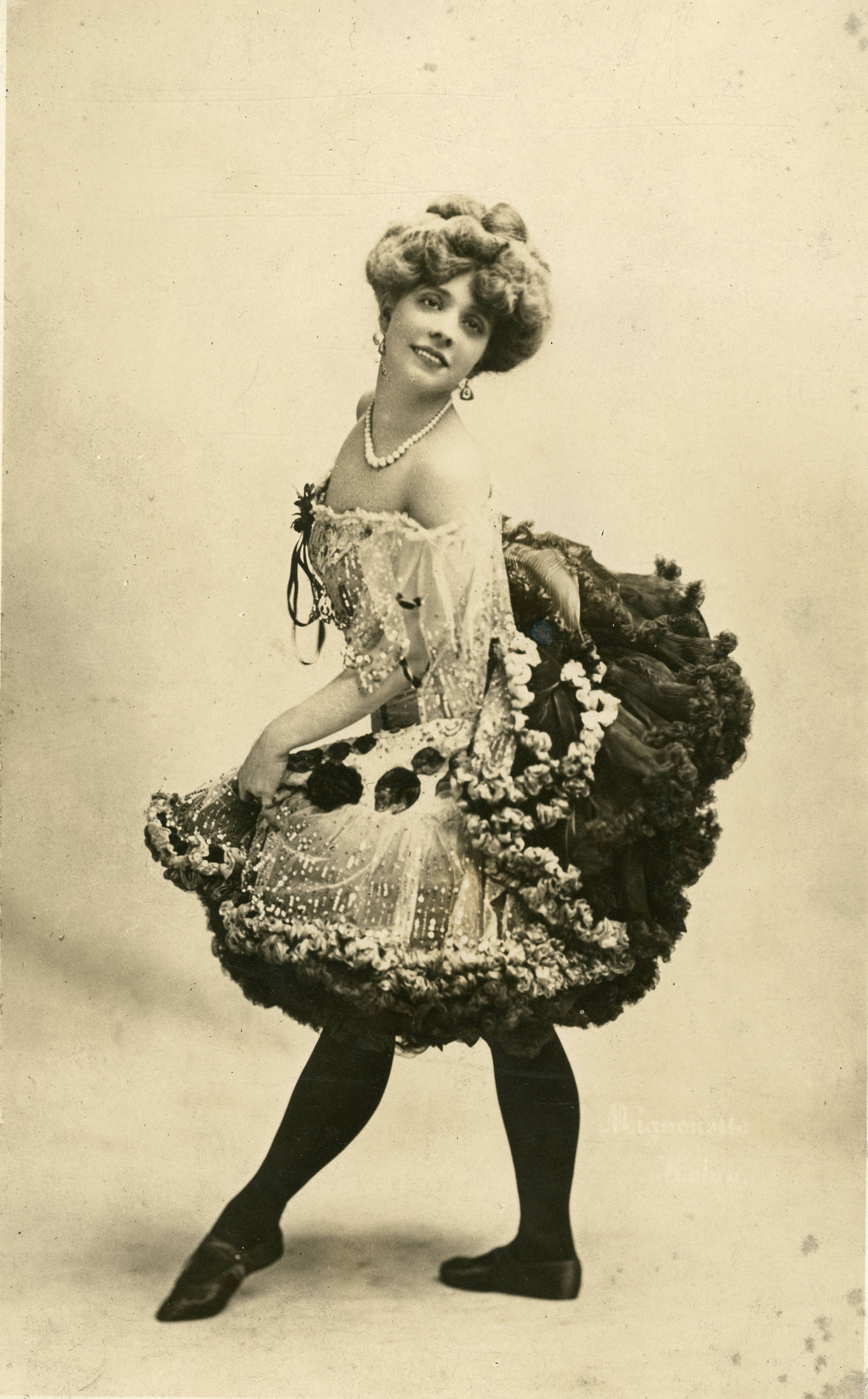
- Kokin in 1911
- Born: Margaret A. Cutting; August 5, 1880; Chester, Pennsylvania U.S.
- Died: May 16, 1957 (aged 76); Chicago, Illinois U.S.
- Other names: Margaret A. Galetti
- Occupations: Dancer; singer; comedian
- Years active: 1900–1925
- Spouse: Charles F. Galetti (m.1903–1931, his death)

Mignonette Kokin (born Margaret A Cutting; August 5, 1880 – May 16, 1957) was an American dancer, singer, and comedic actress in vaudeville.

== Early life ==
Margaret A. "Mignonette" Cutting was born in Chester, Pennsylvania, the daughter of Ella (or Ellen) L. Moseley Kokin and Charles W. Cutting. Her mother was an actress on the vaudeville stage; her stepfather, Prince Kokin, was a juggler from Tokyo. She recalled a childhood spent in London and Paris.

== Career ==
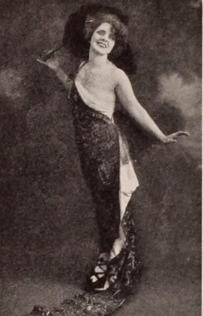
Mignonette Kokin, from a 1923 publication.

Mignonette Kokin danced and did comedic impersonations on the vaudeville circuit in the United States, danced in Paris, and toured Great Britain and Ireland. She was described in 1903 as "a chic little dancer" and "a buxom little beauty whose refinement and gorgeous gowns almost hypnotize the fair sex."

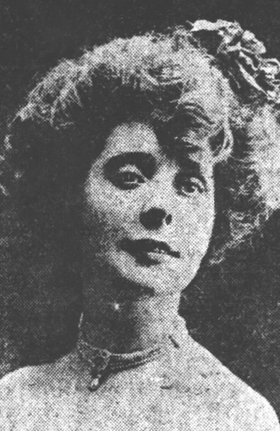
Mignonette Kokin, from a 1911 publication.

Kokin often worked alongside the monkey act run by her husband, Charles F. Galetti. In 1907, she detailed her encounter with a simian costar in a New York theatre in 1907, a story published with exaggerated illustrations, under the headline "Hugged by a Big Baboon": "All of the nightmares in the world rolled into one," Kokin wrote, "cannot compare with those awful moments I passed in the arms of this repulsive brute, strong enough and ferocious enough to crush my slender body like an eggshell." In 1908 she toured Australia, again sharing bills with the baboon act. She and Galetti's monkeys were back in California in 1911, Kentucky in 1913, and in Utah in 1915.

From 1922 to 1924, Kokin was again touring in the United States with her new "high speed dancing" act with Maria Galetti, "Two in a Revue". After she retired from the stage, she and her stepfather ran a dancing school in Philadelphia.

== Personal life ==
Mignonette Kokin and Charles F. Galetti eloped in 1903, over her mother's objections. They had a son, Ferdinand, who was born and died in infancy later that year. She was widowed when Charles died in 1931. She had a stroke in 1951, while living in Philadelphia. She died in 1957, aged 76, in Chicago and is interred at Chester Rural Cemetery in Chester, Pennsylvania.
