= William Ward Jr. =

American politician (1865–1949)

Pennsylvania House of Representatives, Delaware County
- In office 1909–1912
- Preceded by: William D. Jones Jr.
- Succeeded by: V. Gilpin Robinson

Mayor of Chester, Pennsylvania
- In office 1911–1915
- Preceded by: David M. Johnson
- Succeeded by: Wesley S. McDowell

Mayor of Chester, Pennsylvania
- In office 1932–1939
- Preceded by: T. Woodward Trainer
- Succeeded by: Clifford H. Peoples

Personal details
- Born: July 7, 1865 West Chester, Pennsylvania, U.S.
- Died: March 6, 1949 (aged 83)
- Resting place: Chester Rural Cemetery, Chester, Pennsylvania, U.S.
- Party: Republican
- Spouse: Rosa (Mackinson) Ward

William Ward Jr. (July 7, 1865 – March 6, 1949) was an American politician from Pennsylvania who served as a Republican member of the Pennsylvania House of Representatives for Delaware County for the 1909 and 1911 terms. He also served as mayor of Chester, Pennsylvania, from 1911 to 1915 and again from 1932 to 1939. He is the son of U.S. Congressman William Ward.

== Early life and education ==
Ward was born in Chester, Pennsylvania to William and Clara (Ulrich) Ward, and graduated from Chester High School in 1883.

Ward worked as a real estate broker and in the fire insurance business.

== Career ==
Ward was elected to the Chester City Council.

Ward was elected controller for the City of Chester from 1905 to 1911. He was elected as a member of the House of Representatives for Delaware County for the 1909 and 1911 terms. Ward resigned from the House on November 28, 1911.

Ward served as mayor of Chester, Pennsylvania from 1911 to 1915 and for a second term from 1932 to 1939.

Ward served as the clerk to the Pennsylvania House of Representatives from 1939 to 1940.

Ward also served as prothonotary for the Courts of Delaware County.

== Personal life ==
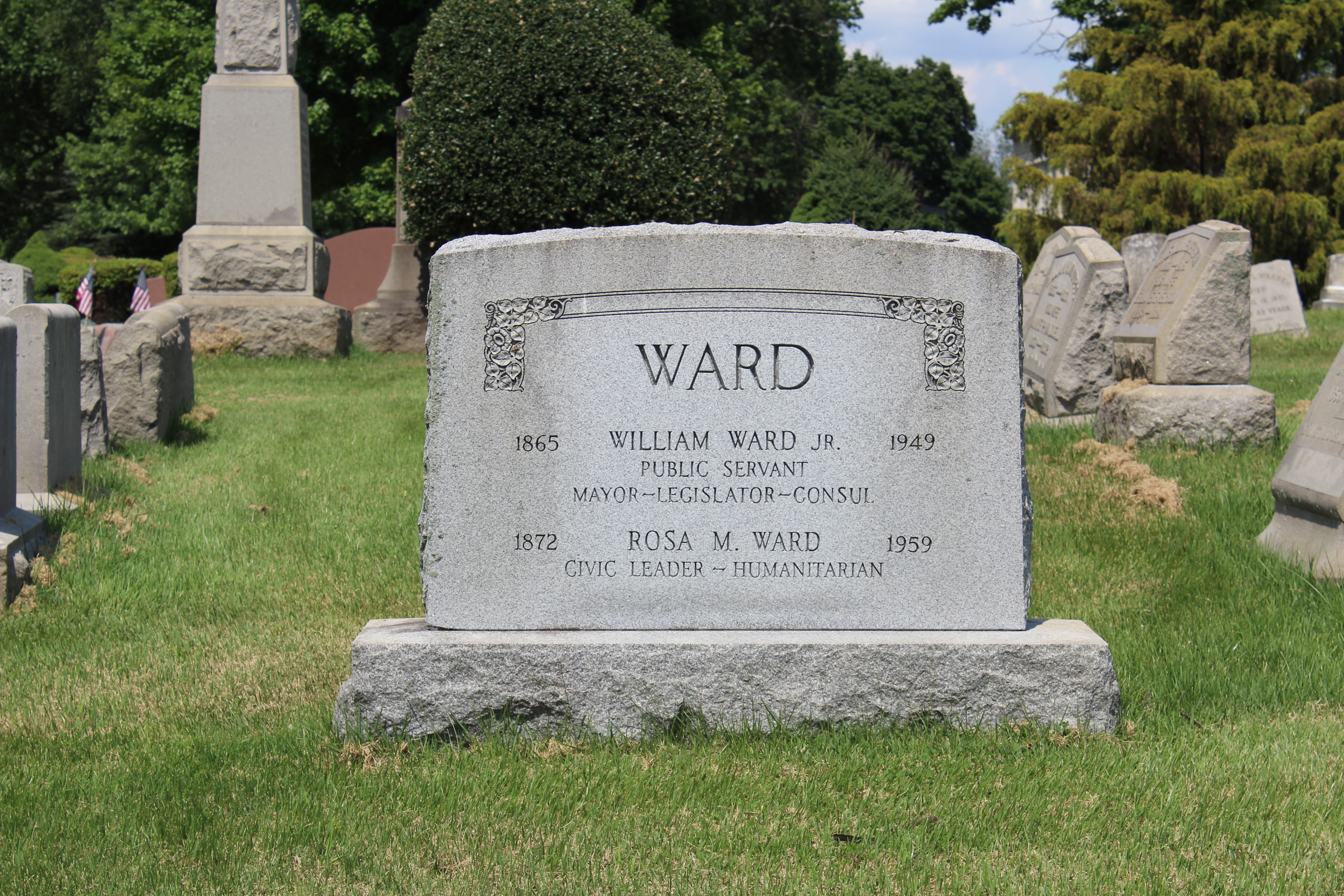
William Ward Jr. tombstone in Chester Rural Cemetery

Ward was married to Rosa (Mackinson) Ward. He died on March 6, 1949, and was interred at the Chester Rural Cemetery in Chester, Pennsylvania.

== See also ==
- List of mayors of Chester, Pennsylvania

Pennsylvania House of Representatives
Preceded by William D. Jones, Jr.	Member of the Pennsylvania House of Representatives, Delaware County; 1909–1911	Succeeded by V. Gilpin Robinson
Political offices
Preceded by David M. Johnson	Mayor of Chester, Pennsylvania; 1911–1915	Succeeded by Wesley S. McDowell
Preceded by T. Woodward Trainer	Mayor of Chester, Pennsylvania; 1932–1939	Succeeded by Clifford H. Peoples
