= Nicholas K. Miller =

American football player (born 1950)

Profile
- Position: Middle guard

Personal information
- Born: January 12, 1960 (age 66)
- Listed height: 6 ft 2 in (1.88 m)
- Listed weight: 224 lb (102 kg)

Career information
- High school: Saint James
- College: Ohio State (1977–1981)

Awards and highlights
- Liberty Bowl winner (1981)

Nicholas K. Miller (January 12, 1960) is an American former football player who played college football for the Ohio State Buckeyes as a Middle guard.

== Playing career ==
Miller played high school football for Saint James High School, in Chester, Pennsylvania, as a defensive tackle and offensive fullback. Recruited by Woody Hayes in 1977, Miller moved to Columbus, Ohio to begin his football career after turning down scholarships from Boston College and Maryland University.

Miller starred at the 1981 Liberty Bowl, where he recorded eight tackles and recovered a fumble for the Buckeyes. In his senior season, he was voted Most Inspirational Player and the team's Defensive Lineman of the Year.

In 2001, Miller was inducted into the Delaware County (PA) Hall of Fame.

== Later life ==
After graduating from OSU, Miller began a successful career in pharmaceutical sales in central Ohio, where he resides today. Miller is married to Stephanie Miller, with three daughters.
