= Edward Nothnagle =

American politician

Member of the Pennsylvania House of Representatives from the Delaware County district
- In office January 13, 1926 – 1936
- Preceded by: Walter H. Craig
- Succeeded by: Adie S. Rush

Personal details
- Born: November 20, 1866 Chester, Pennsylvania, U.S.
- Died: February 14, 1938 (aged 71) Chester, Pennsylvania, U.S.
- Resting place: Chester Rural Cemetery, Chester, Pennsylvania, U.S.
- Party: Republican

Edward Nothnagle (November 20, 1866 – February 14, 1938) was an American politician from Pennsylvania who served as a Republican member of the Pennsylvania House of Representatives for Delaware County from 1926 to 1936.

== Early life ==
Nothnagle was born in Chester, Pennsylvania to William and Barbara Weis Nothnagle and was educated in the public schools.

== Career ==
Nothnagle worked as a painter and decorator. He was elected to the Chester city council.

He was elected to the Pennsylvania House of Representatives for Delaware County by special election on January 5, 1926 to serve the remainder of the 1925 term after the resignation of Walter H. Craig. He was sworn into office on January 13, 1926 and served 5 consecutive terms until 1936. He was not a candidate for reelection to the House for the 1937 term.

He died in Chester, Pennsylvania and is interred at the Chester Rural Cemetery.

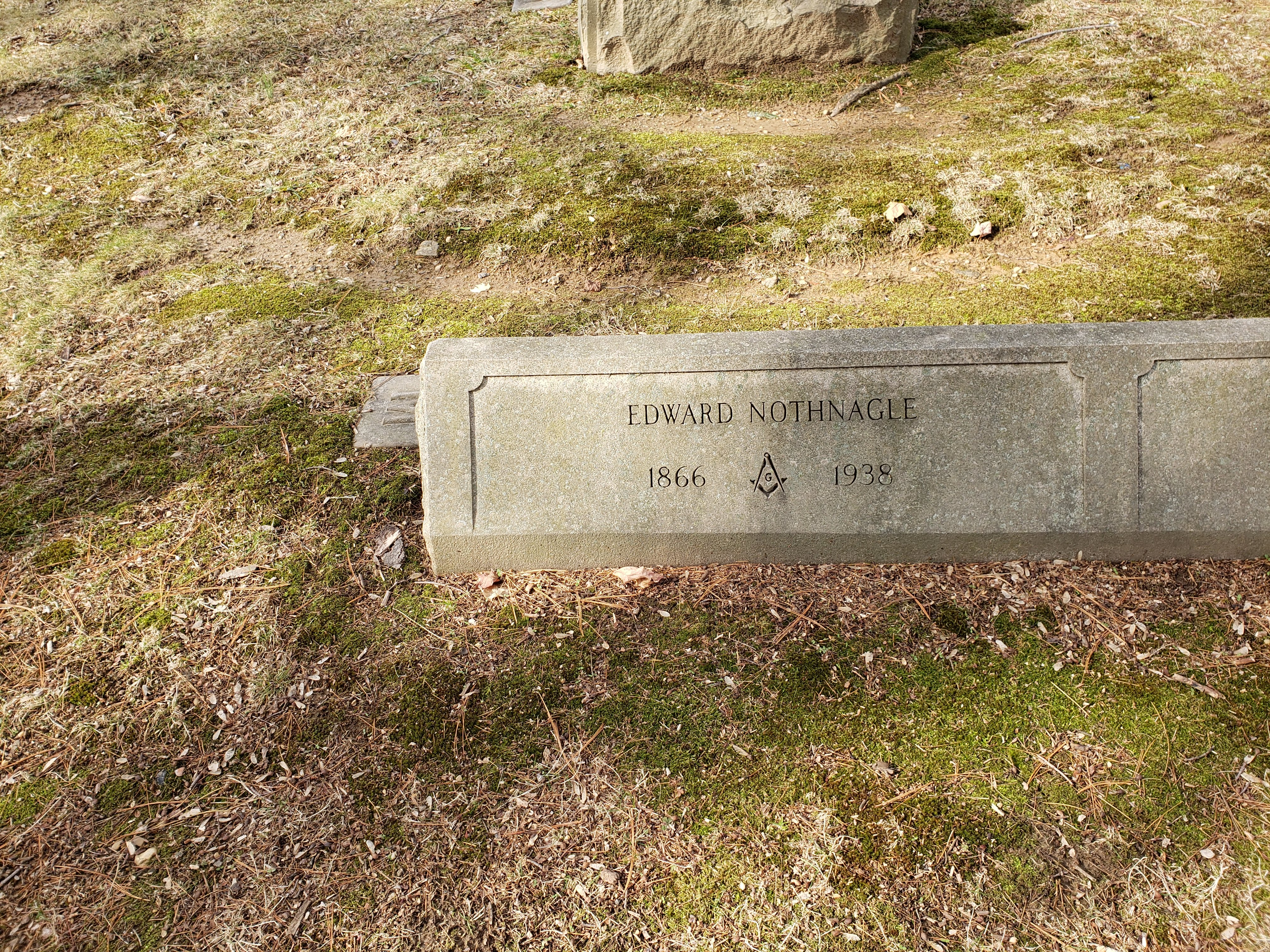
Edward Nothnagle grave

== Personal life ==
He was married to Margaret Goff. He was a member of the Freemasons Chester Lodge #236, Woodmen of the World and the Elks.
