= Wilbur Kirkland =

American basketball player (born 1947)

Personal information
- Born: 1947 (age 78–79) South Carolina
- Listed height: 6 ft 7 in (2.01 m)
- Listed weight: 190 lb (86 kg)

Career information
- High school: Chester (Chester, Pennsylvania)
- College: Cheyney (1966–1969)
- NBA draft: 1969: undrafted
- Playing career: 1969–1978
- Position: Forward
- Number: 35

Career history
- 1969: Pittsburgh Pipers
- Stats at Basketball Reference

Wilbur Kirkland (born 1947), also known as Willie Kirkland, is an American former professional basketball player. After a college career at Cheyney University of Pennsylvania, Kirkland played in two games for the Pittsburgh Pipers in the American Basketball Association. He was then drafted into the United States Army and, after serving for 18 months in the armed forces, he returned to basketball. Kirkland spent the next eight years playing for teams in Greece, Italy, and Switzerland, retiring from professional basketball in 1978.

Wilbur is also the older brother of Thaddeus Kirkland, a Democratic member of the Pennsylvania House of Representatives from 1993 until 2016 and mayor of Chester, Pennsylvania until 2023.
