= Sleeper's College =

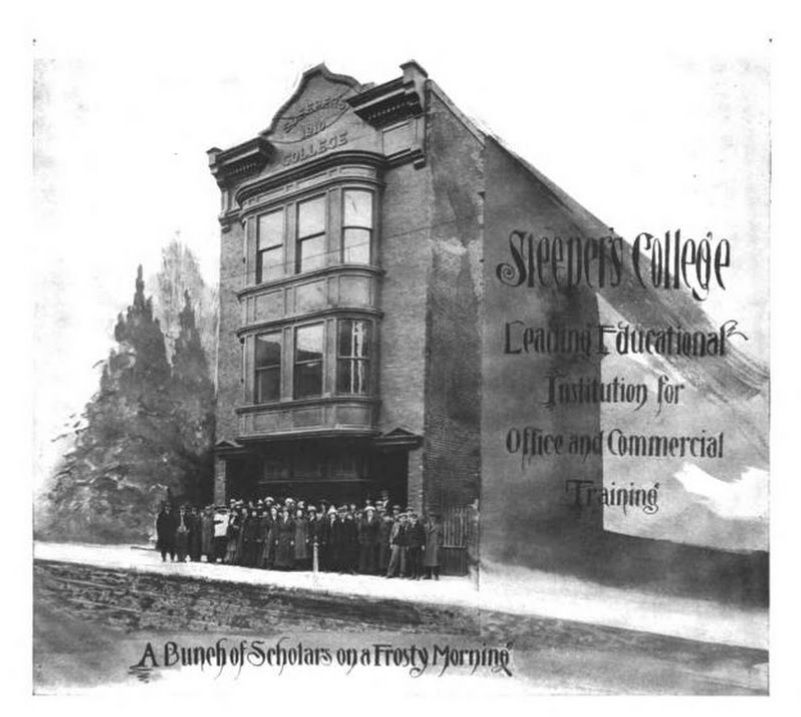
Sleeper's College in Chester, Pennsylvania

Sleeper's College (sometimes referred to as Sleeper's Business College) was a college founded by Josiah Sleeper in Chester, Pennsylvania, in 1910. In 1971, the college moved a few miles to 2800 Edgmont Avenue in Parkside, Pennsylvania, where it operated until 1989.

A photo, apparently an advertisement, of "Scholars On A Frosty Morning" in front of the original building at 625 Welsh Street describes the college as a "Leading Institution For Office and Commercial Training."

The 1944 "Chester Times" yearbook, p. 94, said:

The Sleeper's Business College, located in its own building at 625 Welsh St, Chester, was planned for educational purposes. The school offers secretarial and accounting courses to young men and women, and the curriculum of the public school is open to both young and old. The method of individual instruction is particularly adapted for the backward pupil.

In the 1950s, the ground floor of 625 Welsh was occupied by the Welsh Restaurant, a diner-style restaurant. The building was razed in May 2013. (Location: )
