= Clarence D. Bell =

American politician

Member of the Pennsylvania Senate from the 9th district
- In office January 3, 1961 – July 26, 2002
- Preceded by: George Watkins
- Succeeded by: Dominic Pileggi

Member of the Pennsylvania House of Representatives from the Delaware County district
- In office January 3, 1955 – November 30, 1960

Personal details
- Born: February 4, 1914 Upland, Pennsylvania, U.S.
- Died: July 26, 2002 (aged 88) Chester, Pennsylvania, U.S.
- Resting place: Chester Rural Cemetery, Chester, Pennsylvania
- Party: Republican
- Spouse: Mary Isabel James
- Children: 2 children
- Education: Swarthmore College (BA); Harvard University (LLB); U.S. Army Command and General Staff College

Clarence Deshong Bell (February 4, 1914 – July 26, 2002) was an American politician who served as a Republican member of the Pennsylvania's 9th Senatorial district from 1960 until his death in 2002. He also served as a member of the Pennsylvania House of Representatives from 1954 to 1959.

Bell is the longest-serving state senator in Pennsylvania history.

== Early life and education ==
Bell was born in Upland, Pennsylvania on February 4, 1914, to Samuel R. and Belle (Hanna) Bell. Bell graduated from Swarthmore College in 1935. He graduated from Harvard Law School in 1938 and received a doctorate in law from Harvard Law School in 1970. Bell also studied at the US Army Command and General Staff College.

== Personal life ==
Bell was a Major General in the Pennsylvania National Guard and served during World War II. Bell served for 38 years in the Army and reserves.

Bell is interred at the Chester Rural Cemetery in Chester, Pennsylvania.

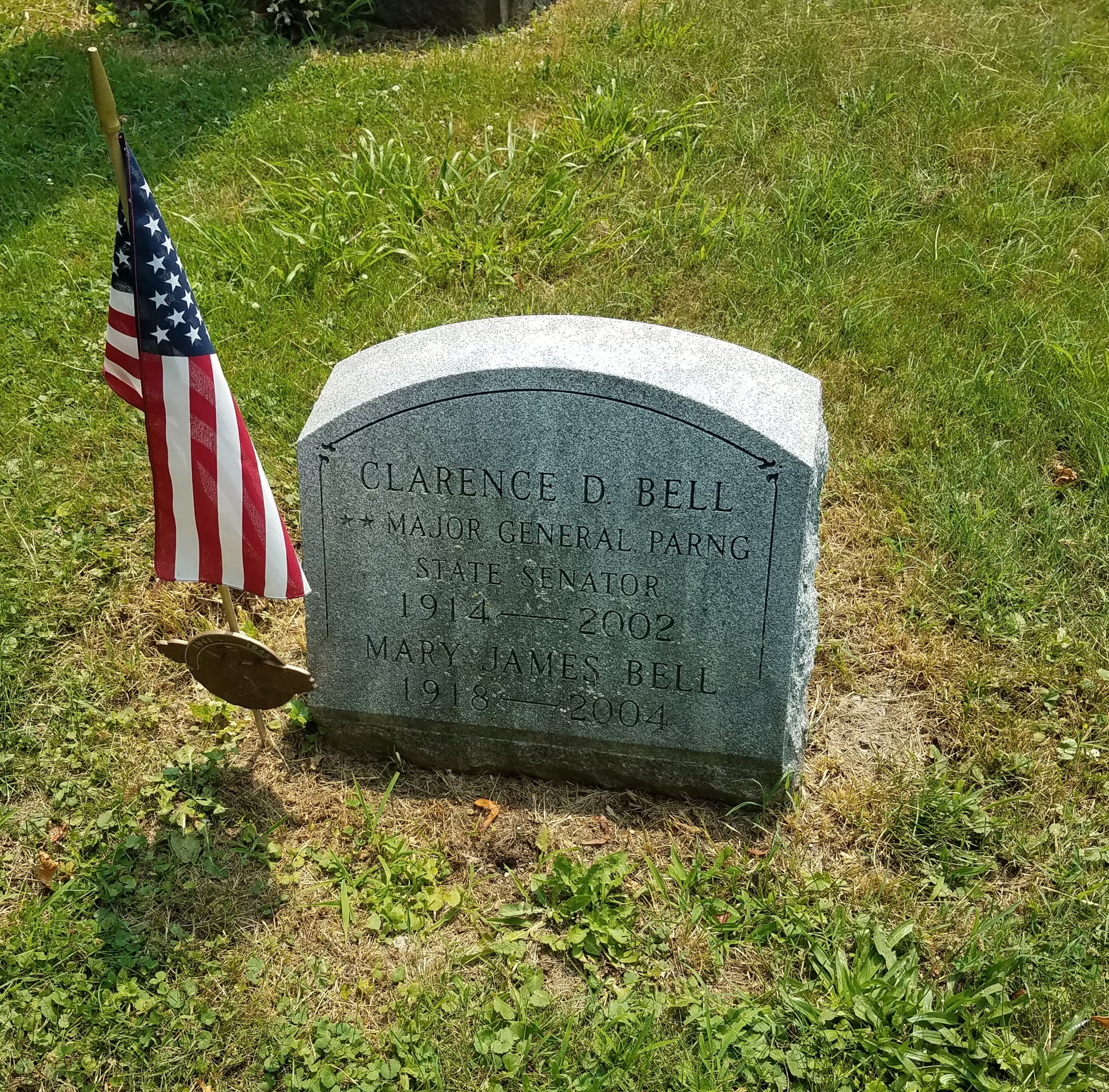
Clarence D. Bell gravesite at Chester Rural Cemetery in Chester, Pennsylvania in 2018
