= Stefan Roots =

American politician

Mayor of Chester, Pennsylvania
- Incumbent
- Assumed office January 1, 2024
- Preceded by: Thaddeus Kirkland

Member of the Chester City Council from the at-large district
- In office January 3, 2022 – December 31, 2023
- Preceded by: William Jacobs

Personal details
- Born: Chester, Pennsylvania, U.S.
- Party: Democratic
- Education: Villanova University
- Occupation: Electrical engineer, politician, blogger

Stefan Roots is an American politician currently serving as the Democratic mayor of Chester, Pennsylvania, since January 3, 2024. He defeated the incumbent Thaddeus Kirkland in the May 2023 Democratic mayoral primary and Anita J. Littleton in the November 2023 general election. He previously served as a member of the Chester City Council from 2022 to 2024.

== Education and professional career ==
Roots was born in Chester to a 15-year old single mother. He attended Archmere Academy in Wilmington, Delaware, and graduated from Chester High School. He received a Bachelor's degree in electrical engineering from Villanova University.

He lived in Denver, Colorado, and New York City but moved back to Chester after 2001. He worked in engineering, marketing and sales roles for Philadelphia Gas Works, IBM, MCI and the Delaware County Daily Times. He also worked in industrial operations for Sunoco, Praxair and DELCORA. He worked as a substitute teacher for one year in the Chester-Upland School District.

He served as a director on several boards including the Delaware County Interactive Gaming Revenue Authority, the Delaware County Historical Society and the Chester Education Foundation.

In 2006, he published a monthly paper Chester Spotlight which in 2010 evolved into the blog Chester Matters. In 2012, he published a book titled Toxic Man - the Melvin Wade Story. In 2016, he published a podcast, "Dirty Water Dude", which focused on practical ways to obtain clean drinking water. In 2017, he published a book titled "How to Buy a Water Filter".

== Political career ==
Roots defeated William Jacobs in the Chester city council Democratic primary in May 2021. In January 2022, Roots was elected to Chester City Council and served as Director of Public Property and Recreation.

In May 2023, Roots defeated the two term incumbent mayor Thaddeus Kirkland in the Chester Democratic mayoral primary election by nearly twice the vote. There was no Republican opponent, and Roots defeated independent candidate Anita J. Littleton in the November 2023 general election. He was sworn into office on January 1, 2024.

== Personal life ==
He is married and has seven children and ten grandchildren.

== Publications ==
- Toxic Man - The Melvin Wade Story, Communicate U Media, LLC, ISBN 9780988892101, 2013
- How to Buy a Water Filter - Everything You Need to Know to Select the Right Home Water Filter for You and Your Family, CreateSpace Independent Publishing Platform, ISBN 9781548275990, 2017

Political offices
Preceded by Thaddeus Kirkland	Mayor of Chester; 2024–present	Incumbent
Preceded by	Councilman Chester City Council; 2022–2024	Succeeded by
