= Walter H. Craig =

American politician

Member of the Pennsylvania House of Representatives from the Delaware County district
- In office 1923 – September 1, 1925
- Succeeded by: Edward Nothnagle

Personal details
- Born: February 24, 1880 Chester, Pennsylvania, U.S.
- Died: November 25, 1937 (aged 57) Chester, Pennsylvania, U.S.
- Resting place: Chester Rural Cemetery, Chester, Pennsylvania, U.S.
- Party: Republican

Walter Hibshman Craig (February 24, 1880 – November 25, 1937) was an American politician from Pennsylvania who served as a Republican member of the Pennsylvania House of Representatives for Delaware County from 1923 to 1925.

== Early life ==
Craig was born in Chester, Pennsylvania. He graduated from Chester High School and attended Pierce Business College.

== Career ==
Craig worked as president of Penn Ice Works, Inc. from 1901 to 1920 and as proprietor of Penn Purity Ice Cream from 1914 to 1920.

He was elected to the Pennsylvania House of Representatives for Delaware County and served from 1923 to 1925. He resigned from the House on September 1, 1925 and was replaced by Edward Nothnagle by special election on January 5, 1926.

He was elected to the Chester City Council and served from 1925 to 1937 including as the director of parks and public property from 1925 to 1935 and as director of accounts and finances from 1935 to 1937.

He died in Chester, Pennsylvania and is interred at the Chester Rural Cemetery.

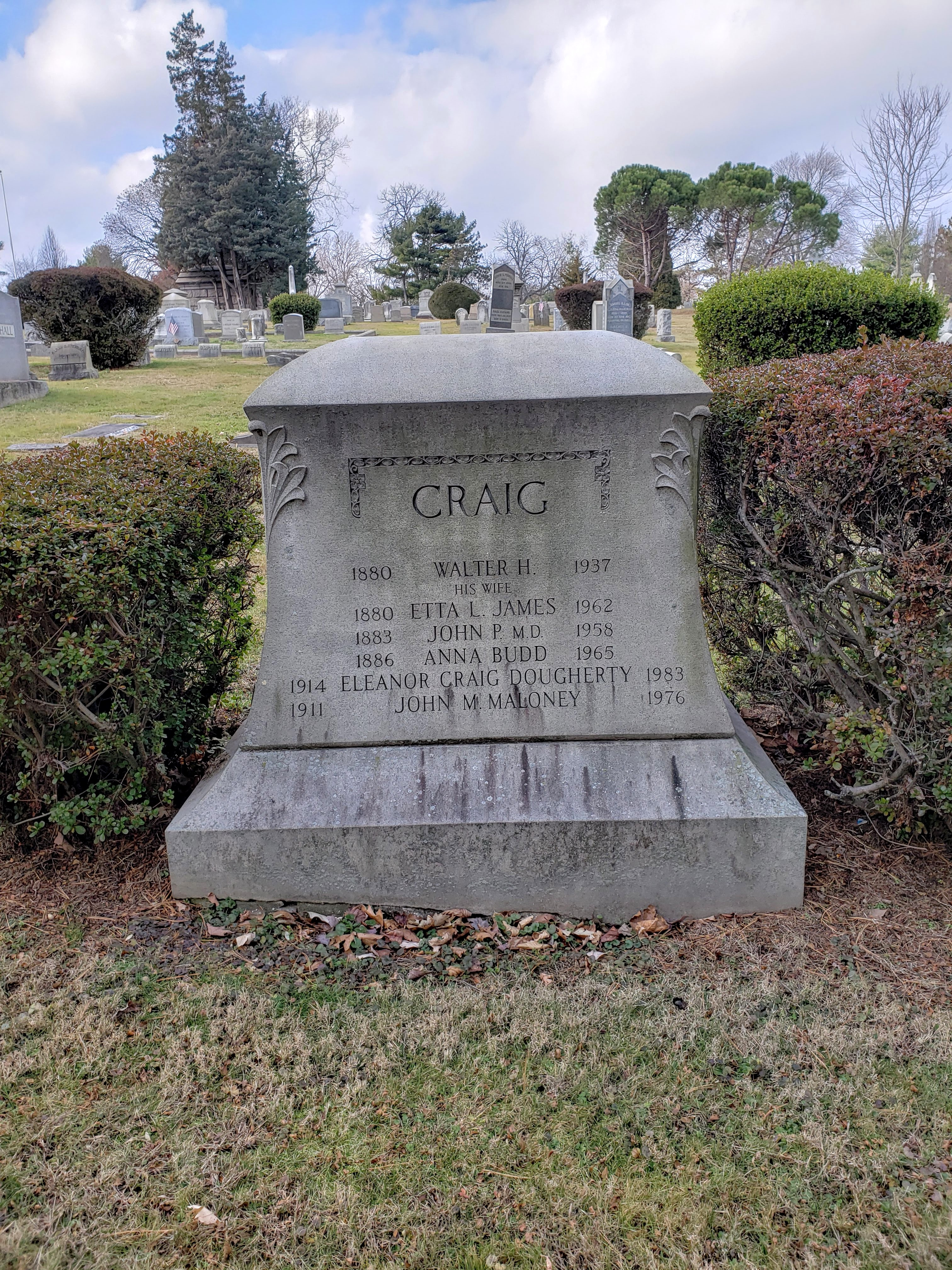
Walter H. Craig grave

== Personal life ==
Craig was married to Etta James. He was a member of the Free & Accepted Masons.
