= Thaddeus Kirkland =

American politician (born 1955)

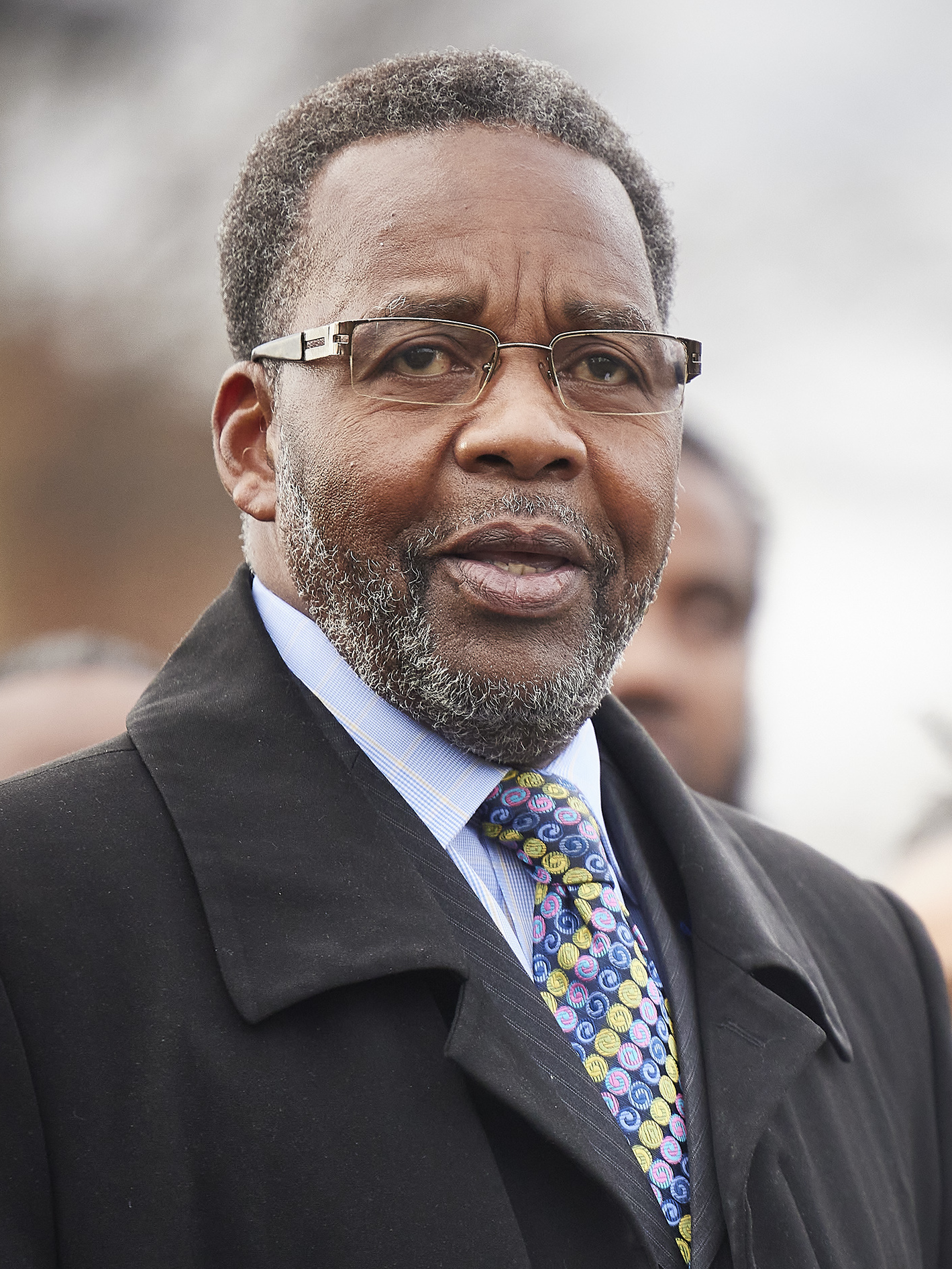

Mayor of Chester, Pennsylvania
- In office January 4, 2016 – January 3, 2023
- Preceded by: John Linder
- Succeeded by: Stefan Roots

Member of the Pennsylvania House of Representatives from the 159th district
- In office January 5, 1993 – November 30, 2016
- Preceded by: Robert C. Wright
- Succeeded by: Brian Joseph Kirkland

Personal details
- Born: January 12, 1955 (age 71) Chester, Pennsylvania, U.S.
- Party: Democratic
- Spouse: Susie
- Occupation: Pastor of Community Baptist Church, Chester, Pennsylvania

Thaddeus Kirkland (born January 12, 1955) is an American politician who served as the Democratic Mayor of Chester, Pennsylvania from 2016 to 2024. In May 2023, he lost the Democratic mayoral primary to Stefan Roots. He served as a Democratic member of the 159th district from 1993 to 2016.

== Early life and education ==
Born in Chester, Kirkland graduated from Chester High School in 1973 and Cheyney University in 1990 with a Bachelor of Arts in Communications and Eastern Baptist Theological Seminary. Kirkland is a graduate of the Widener University Leadership Academy and is a member of Wine Psi Phi and Omega Psi Phi fraternities.

Kirkland was a community service coordinator at Crozer Chester Medical Center, where he directed outreach and educational programs for teenagers.

== Political career ==
=== Pennsylvania House of Representatives ===
In 1993, Kirkland was elected as a Democratic member to the Pennsylvania House of Representatives 159th district. He was reelected 10 times, serving 11 consecutive 2-year terms.

Kirkland served as the Democratic Chairman of the House Tourism and Recreational Development Committee and as a member of the Pennsylvania Legislative Black Caucus. In 2002, he was named to the PoliticsPA list of Best Dressed Legislators.

He was not a candidate for reelection in 2016 and was succeeded by his nephew, Brian Joseph Kirkland.

==== Sponsored legislation ====
In the 2015-2016 session, Kirkland sponsored several bills, including: HB 418 concerning human-shaped targets at shooting ranges, HB 419 concerning crimes that could not be expunged from a criminal record, and HB 420 concerning body cameras to be worn by police officers. None of these bills were voted on. Kirkland has been involved in areas of prayer in school, video surveillance, technical training, and Head Start programs.

==== Chester-Upland School District controversies ====
In June 2011, Kirkland announced that if $20 million worth of cuts were not restored to the Chester Upland School District, he planned to file a federal lawsuit against Pennsylvania to close the three public high schools in Chester. However, the school board did not support Kirkland's plan, calling a press conference where they stated that they were "fully capable of speaking for" themselves and "totally disagree" with what Kirkland wanted to do. In August 2017, Kirkland welcomed the opening of the Chester Charter School for the Arts, a $25 million public, non-profit charter school on an 11-acre campus on Highland Avenue with kindergarten through 11th grade classes with a focus on music, dance, theater and visual arts.

=== Mayor of Chester ===
In the 2015 Democratic mayoral primary, Kirkland defeated incumbent Mayor John Linder 1,818 to 721 and then former mayor, Republican Wendell Butler Jr., in the election. Just before taking office on January 4, 2016, he promised to reduce violence in the city by improving the schools and police force and using body cameras.

Kirkland decided to stay on as the representative of Chester, as well as serving as mayor. He is the first representative who has resigned and then rescinded his resignation. The House Democratic spokesman stated that because of this action, he will not be taking a mayoral salary until he departs from the House, and instead will take his legislative pay and continue to count toward his pension credits.

In May 2023, he was defeated in the Democratic mayoral primary by Stefan Roots.

== Personal life ==
Kirkland is the pastor of the Community Baptist Church in Chester, Pennsylvania and Vice President of the West End Ministerial Fellowship of Chester and Vicinity. He is a former Board of Trustee member of Lincoln University.

Kirkland is married to Susie and together they have five daughters. Kirkland is the younger brother of former professional basketball player Wilbur Kirkland.

== See also ==
- List of mayors of Chester, Pennsylvania

Political offices
Preceded by John Linder	Mayor of Chester; 2016–2024	Succeeded by Stefan Roots
Pennsylvania House of Representatives
Preceded by Robert C. Wright (politician)	Member of the Pennsylvania House of Representatives from the 159th district 1993–2016	Succeeded by Brian Joseph Kirkland
