= Eddystone explosion =

1917 disaster in Pennsylvania, USA

- Date: April 10, 1917
- Time: 10:00:00 a.m.
- Location: Eddystone, Pennsylvania; 39°51′41″N 075°20′21″W
- Cause: Potentially Faulty Equipment
- Motive: Sabotage
- Deaths: 139
- Injuries: 100+
- Suspects: German saboteurs; Russian saboteurs

On April 10, 1917, four days after the United States declared war on Germany, an explosion at the Eddystone Ammunition Corporation's artillery shell plant in Eddystone, Pennsylvania, killed 139 people. The majority were women and girls who worked in the loading room, loading shells with black powder. 55 of the victims could not be identified and were buried in a mass grave. Hundreds more were injured. The victims were arguably among the first American casualties of World War I.

The explosion was initially blamed on German saboteurs, and later on Russians. It may in fact have been an accident caused by malfunctioning equipment.

== Background ==
The Eddystone Arsenal, built in 1916, was located near Chester, Pennsylvania, where the Eddystone Power Station now stands. At the time of the explosion it was reportedly manufacturing shells for the Russian White Army.

About 380 women and girls worked in the plant's "F" Building. The company had placed newspaper ads specifically recruiting "girls" for the job. The building had three divisions: the pellet room, where girls made the black powder fuses that ran through the center of the shrapnel shells; the loading room, where the fuses were inserted and "pocket cups" at the bottom of the shells were filled with loose powder; and the inspection room, where the finished product was inspected. Normally only about thirty girls worked in the pellet room, but two weeks earlier the company had hired about seventy more to fill a large rush order that was due to be shipped in a few days.

== Disaster ==
On Monday, April 10, 1917, just before 10 a.m., a massive explosion demolished the plant's "F" building, killing 139 people. (Note: The reported death toll ranges from "over 100" to "almost 150".) According to the New York Times, it started when some 18 tons of black powder somehow ignited, setting off thousands of shrapnel shells, causing "a series of detonations that shook a half dozen boroughs within a radius of ten miles of the plant." The majority of those killed were women and girls who worked in the loading room. Hundreds of others were injured, some maimed or badly burned.

Some bodies were found in the nearby Delaware River. Workers may have sought safety there from the fire and drowned, or they may have been thrown there by the blast.

== Aftermath ==
=== Rescue efforts ===
The company employed special guards who were the first on the scene. They were joined by the fire department and cadets from the nearby Pennsylvania Military Academy. One of their first tasks was to stop the fire from setting off the more than 50 tons of black powder that were sitting in a storage facility near the loading and inspection area. Several men climbed to the roof of the facility and hosed it down. Many rescuers were injured by flying shrapnel. One, John Hansen, had his leg blown off.

One reporter wrote that for the locals who rushed to the offices of the Chester Times for news of their daughters, "it was their first taste of what war means, for this is war. It is just as much war as is a battle on the British front in France."

=== Investigation ===
Investigators first suspected the plant had been bombed by German saboteurs. Dozens of suspects were arrested. Years later, a federal inquiry cast suspicion on Russian revolutionaries opposed to the czar and the war.

Sabotage was a plausible explanation, as the U.S. was at war. It was also a convenient explanation for the business owners, as it deflected attention from unsafe conditions in the plant. The day of the explosion, company president Samuel M. Vauclain told the New York Times he was convinced it was the work of "some outside person" and not the result of "carelessness by employees"; the implication being that either saboteurs or the victims themselves were to blame. The next day, an unnamed explosives expert told reporters it would have been easy for one of "the women engaged in the packing of time fuses" to plant a bomb.

A guard at the plant told reporters that electrical devices used to shake explosive powder down into the shrapnel shells had been malfunctioning for some time. He suggested that tangled wires in the devices had short-circuited, throwing sparks which ignited the powder. This would be consistent with workers' reports of a "blinding flare" before the explosion. Some of those killed were found with their hands still covering their eyes.

Less than two weeks after the blast, the plant reopened. The local press announced that 900 girls were ready to go to work and many more had applied for jobs. German applicants were turned away.

=== Memorials ===
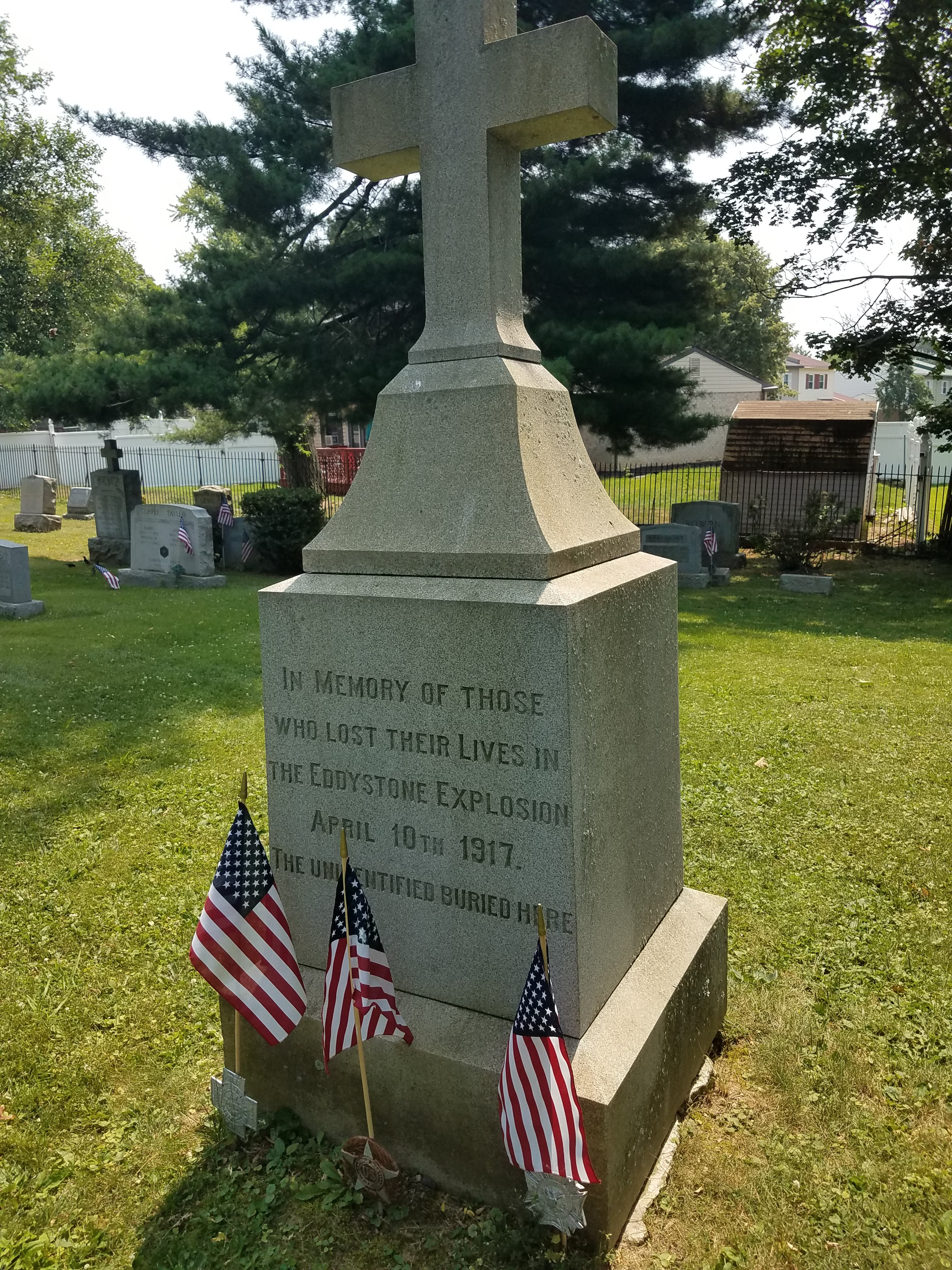
Eddystone explosion memorial in Chester Rural Cemetery in Chester, Pennsylvania

12,000 mourners gathered in the Chester Rural Cemetery on April 13, 1917, for a massive funeral service. The Eddystone Ammunition Corporation paid all of the funeral expenses. The remains of 55 unidentified victims were buried in a mass grave marked by a small monument near Edgmont Avenue.

On April 16, 1917, President Woodrow Wilson gave a speech in which he acknowledged the importance of industrial workers in the war effort:

The industrial forces of the country, men and women alike, will be a great national, a great international, Service Army—a notable and honored host engaged in the service of the nation and the world.

== Sources ==
- Giesberg, Judith Ann (2009). Army at Home: Women and the Civil War on the Northern Home Front. Univ of North Carolina Press. pp. 164–166. ISBN 9780807833070.
- Lockhart, Keith. "The History of Eddystone". Ridley Township History.
- Nash, Jay Robert (1976). Darkest Hours. Rowman & Littlefield. pp. 166–167. ISBN 9781590775264.
- O'Neill, Robert F. (April 19, 1992). "The Mystery Lives Where 139 Perished". Philadelphia Inquirer. Archived from the original on January 13, 2016.
- "SEE SEE PLOT IN POWDER BLOW-UP; Eddystone Plant Officials Convinced the Disaster Was Not an Accident REPORT SEVERAL ARRESTS Former Sailor on German Cruiser Prinz Eitel Friedrich Among Those Detained. MANY OF VICTIMS WOMEN Bodies Mangled by 10,000 Exploding Shrapnel Shells and Burned Beyond Recognition. Austrian Arrested on Suspicion. At Least 50 Explosions. Rescuer's Leg Shot Off. Sure Disaster Was No Accident. 37,500 Pounds of Powder in Building. Many Saved by the Windows. Many Bodies Unidentifiable. 95 Girls' Bodies at the Morgue. Roof Crashed Down on the Girls. Saved by Bodies Piled Above Him. Eddystone Official Charges a Plot. Held for Fatal Blast". The New York Times. April 11, 1917.
- "BELIEVE A BOMB CAUSED EXPLOSION AT CHESTER PLANT; Munitions Officials Convinced That German Plot Was Behind the Disaster. LETTER TOLD OF THE PLAN. Woman Says She Found One Reading, 'Ready to Blow Up Eddystone; Send Help.' 8 MEN ARRESTED YESTERDAY. German Prisoner's Blueprints Prove to be Innocent;-Total Fatalities May Reach 150. Found Note Telling of a Plot. Arrest of a New German Suspect. BELIEVE A BOMB CAUSED EXPLOSION. Names a Man Who Saw the Bomb. Survivor Believes It an Accident. Only 47 Bodies Identified". The New York Times. April 12, 1917.
