= Eddystone, Pennsylvania =

Borough in Pennsylvania, US

- Borough
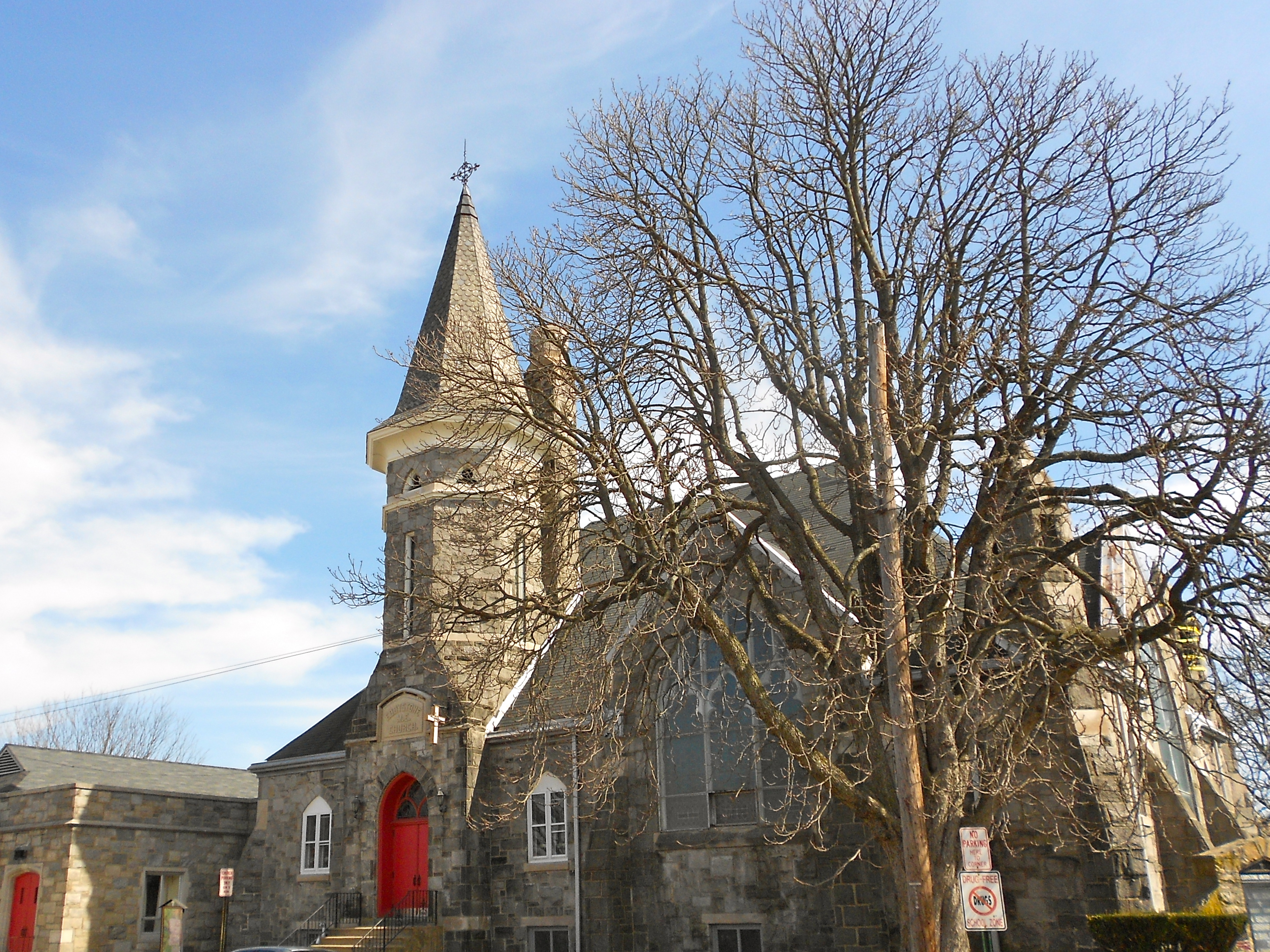
- Eddystone United Methodist Church

- Location in Delaware County and the U.S. state of Pennsylvania.

- Location of Eddystone in Pennsylvania Eddystone (the United States)
- Coordinates: 39°51′34″N 75°20′27″W
- Country: United States
- State: Pennsylvania
- County: Delaware
- Settled: 1641

Area
  - Total: 1.52 sq mi (3.94 km^{2})
  - Land: 1.00 sq mi (2.58 km^{2})
  - Water: 0.53 sq mi (1.37 km^{2})
- Elevation: 20 ft (6.1 m)

Population (2020)
  - Total: 2,459
  - Density: 2,472.5/sq mi (954.64/km^{2})
- Time zone: UTC-5 (EST)
  - Summer (DST): UTC-4 (EDT)
- ZIP Code: 19022
- Area code: 610
- FIPS code: 42-22296
- Website: eddystoneborough.org

Eddystone is a borough in Delaware County, Pennsylvania, United States. The population was 2,459 at the 2020 census.

== History ==
The area at the mouth of Ridley Creek was first called "Tequirassy" by Native Americans. The land was owned by Olof Persson Stille, one of the early settlers from New Sweden, who had immigrated in 1641. Olof Stille, a millwright by trade, came from Penningby Manor in Länna, north of Stockholm, Sweden. After the conquest of the colony by the Dutch in 1658, Stille was one of the four commissaries or magistrates appointed to administer justice among the inhabitants, and thus became a judge of the first court on the banks of the Delaware.

The borough of Eddystone was formed around the Eddystone Print Works. William Simpson & Sons established the Eddystone Print Works on the land that is now Eddystone in October 1873, after the land on which their previous factory had operated was condemned to make way for Fairmount Park.

Eddystone Borough was incorporated on December 7, 1888. Eddystone's petition for incorporation was challenged in court on several grounds, including that "the finances of the township of Ridley and of the Ridley school district will be diminished by the creation of this borough." On December 3, 1888, the Delaware County Court of Common Pleas issued an opinion rejecting these claims, noting that while Ridley's "revenues...will be diminished, so will its burdens."

On April 10, 1917, an explosion at the Eddystone Ammunition Corporation near Chester resulted in the deaths of 133 workers, mostly women.

== Education ==
Children in Eddystone attend school at the Eddystone Elementary School on 9th Street. The elementary school is located on the site of the old Eddystone High School, which burned down in 1960. The students were accommodated by Eddystone United Methodist Church during that time and many of today’s senior citizens remember the church as their school. After children pass the fifth grade, they move onto Ridley Middle School, a part of the Ridley School District.

== Geography ==
Eddystone is located in southern Delaware County at 39°51′34″N 75°20′27″W (39.859345, -75.340920), on the north bank of the Delaware River. It is bordered to the east by Crum Creek, to the west by Ridley Creek. Ridley Township borders Eddystone to the north and east, the city of Chester is on the western border, and Gloucester County, New Jersey, is to the south across the Delaware.

According to the U.S. Census Bureau, Eddystone has a total area of 1.5 square miles (3.9 km^{2}), of which 1.0 square mile (2.6 km^{2}) is land and 0.54 square miles (1.4 km^{2}), or 34.70%, is water, primarily the Delaware River.

== Etymology ==
Eddystone took its name from William Simpson, who was so impressed by the Eddystone Lighthouse on a visit to England that he named the town and print works he had founded after it.

== Demographics ==
Historical population
Census	Pop.	Note	%±
1880	582		—
1900	776		—
1910	1,167		50.4%
1920	2,670		128.8%
1930	2,414		−9.6%
1940	2,493		3.3%
1950	3,014		20.9%
1960	3,006		−0.3%
1970	2,706		−10.0%
1980	2,555		−5.6%
1990	2,446		−4.3%
2000	2,442		−0.2%
2010	2,410		−1.3%
2020	2,459		2.0%

As of Census 2010, the racial makeup of the borough was 82.7% White, 11.7% African American, 0.1% Native American, 1.3% Asian, 1.0% from other races, and 3.2% from two or more races. Hispanic or Latino of any race were 4.4% of the population .

As of the census of 2000, there were 2,442 people, 964 households, and 607 families residing in the borough. The population density was 2,352.6 inhabitants per square mile (908.3/km^{2}). There were 1,035 housing units at an average density of 997.1 per square mile (385.0/km^{2}). The racial makeup of the borough was 95.45% White, 1.76% African American, 0.33% Native American, 0.49% Asian, 0.61% from other races, and 1.35% from two or more races. Hispanic or Latino of any race were 1.84% of the population.

There were 964 households, out of which 31.7% had children under the age of 18 living with them, 40.8% were married couples living together, 16.8% had a female householder with no husband present, and 37.0% were non-families. 32.5% of all households were made up of individuals, and 14.2% had someone living alone who was 65 years of age or older. The average household size was 2.53 and the average family size was 3.24.

In the borough the population was spread out, with 28.4% under the age of 18, 7.2% from 18 to 24, 29.7% from 25 to 44, 20.2% from 45 to 64, and 14.5% who were 65 years of age or older. The median age was 36 years. For every 100 females, there were 95.8 males. For every 100 females age 18 and over, there were 90.6 males.

The median income for a household in the borough was $37,543, and the median income for a family was $47,054. Males had a median income of $36,422 versus $25,069 for females. The per capita income for the borough was $16,537. About 11.6% of families and 12.1% of the population were below the poverty line, including 18.1% of those under age 18 and 16.4% of those age 65 or over.

== Industrial history ==
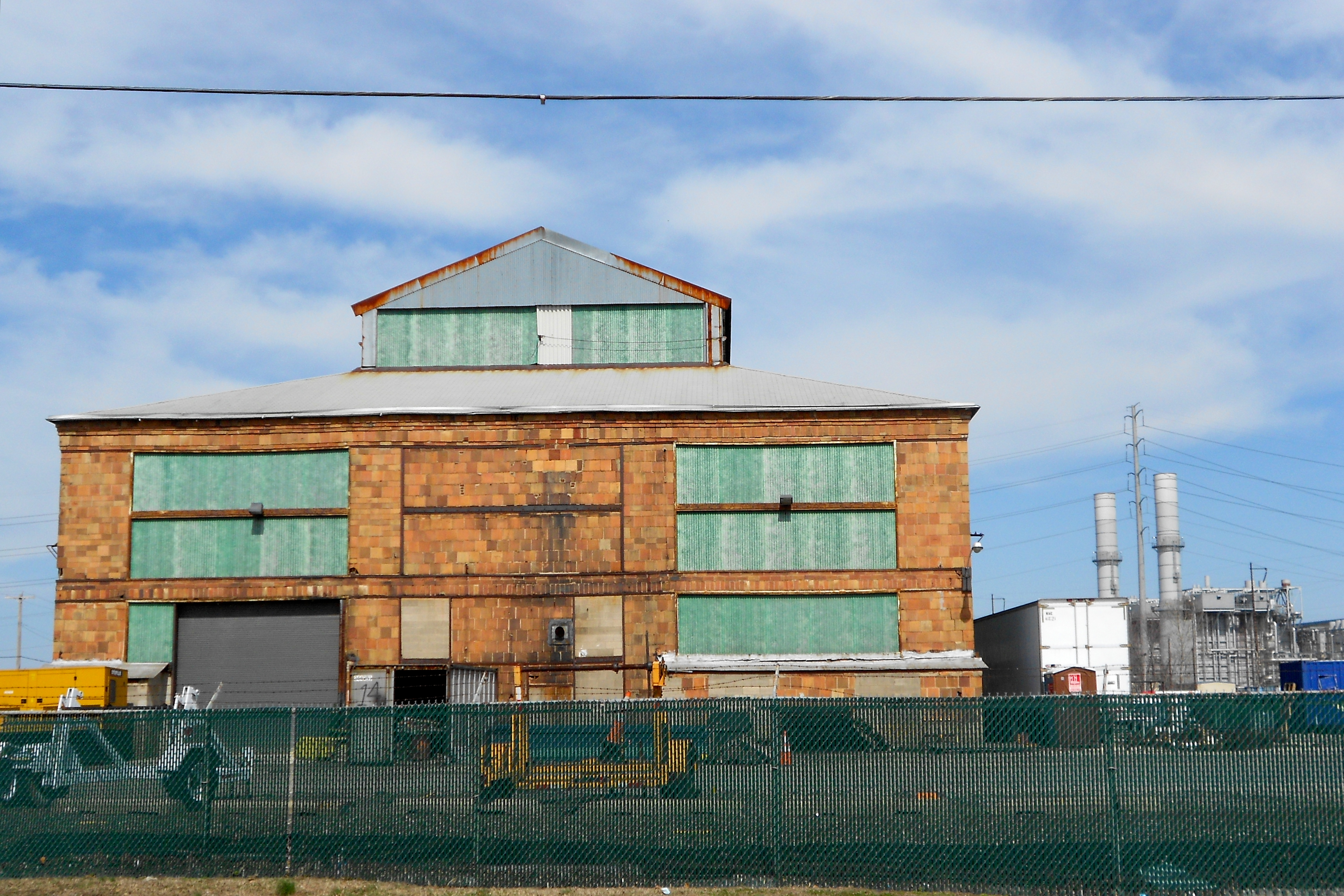
Old factory in Eddystone

Eddystone has a history of heavy industry. Eddystone Arsenal became the largest Baldwin Locomotive Works plant (the smaller being in Spring Garden, Philadelphia). Baldwin was once the largest manufacturer of steam locomotives in the world. Today an Exelon generating station occupies some of the riverfront. The Platt-LePage Aircraft Company built some of the earliest rotorcraft on adjacent land to the northeast (outside the borough). The site's association with military helicopters continued through McDonnell Aircraft and McDonnell Douglas all the way to the present, as a Boeing Integrated Defense Systems plant now operates there.

During World War I, Remington Arms opened the Eddystone Rifle Plant on Baldwin land with Baldwin management. Here it produced the Pattern 1914 Enfield rifle and M1917 Enfield rifle. A large portion of the rifles used by American soldiers in France in World War I were made at Eddystone. In January 1918 Remington Arms was absorbed by Midvale Steel and Ordnance Company, which took over the rifle plant.

Baldwin also formed a subsidiary company (Eddystone Ammunition Corporation) in 1915 to build artillery shells (Russian-model on British order). On 10 April 1917, 133 people were killed in an explosion at the artillery shell plant. A monument in the Chester Rural Cemetery recognizes the unidentified victims.

In 1917 the U.S. government also placed artillery shell orders, and bought out some of the assets of the Eddystone Ammunition Corporation. A new corporation, the similarly named Eddystone Munitions Company, was formed by Baldwin to make the shrapnel for the shells.

== Religion ==
Eddystone United Methodist Church was established in 1891 and is pictured above. The Simpson Family (William Simpson & Sons of the Eddystone Print Works (1873)were the main supporters and contributors. Roman Catholic Archdiocese of Philadelphia operates Catholic churches. St. Rose of Lima Church, established in 1890, is in Eddystone. The number of parishioners increased by 20% from 2008 to 2012, with 4,158 congregants in the latter year.

== Culture ==
Eddystone has the headquarters of the St. James High School for Boys alumni association, a building which has a banquet area, a bar and a chapel. Timothy Logue of Delaware County Daily Times described the building as "de facto museum of everything St. James".

== Transportation ==
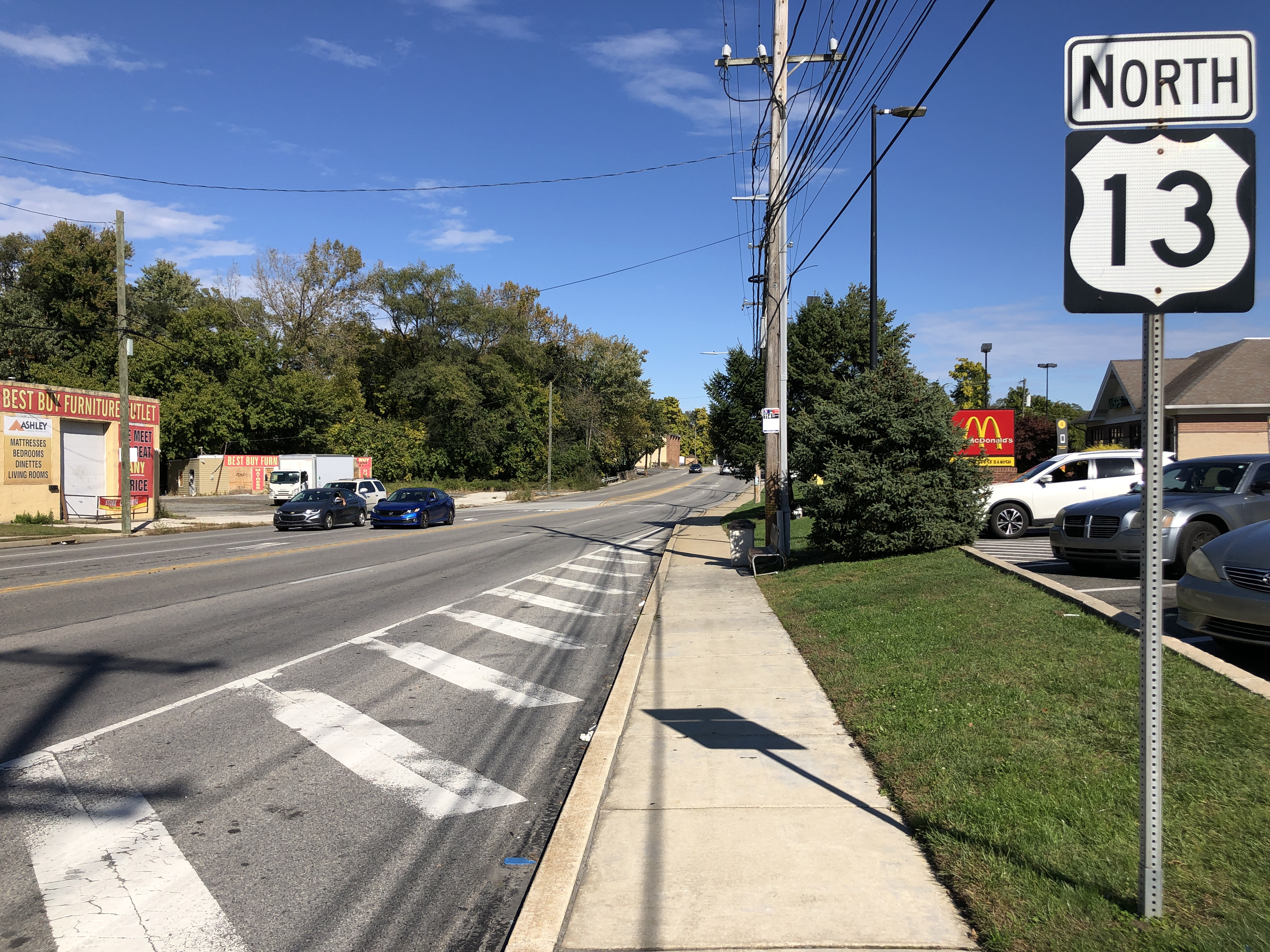
US 13 northbound on the northwestern edge of Eddystone

As of 2010, there were 6.72 miles (10.81 km) of public roads in Eddystone, of which 1.86 miles (2.99 km) were maintained by the Pennsylvania Department of Transportation (PennDOT) and 4.86 miles (7.82 km) were maintained by the borough.

Two numbered highways pass through Eddystone: U.S. Route 13 follows Chester Pike on a southwest-to-northeast alignment along the northwestern edge of the borough, while Pennsylvania Route 291 follows Industrial Highway on a similar alignment through the center of the borough.

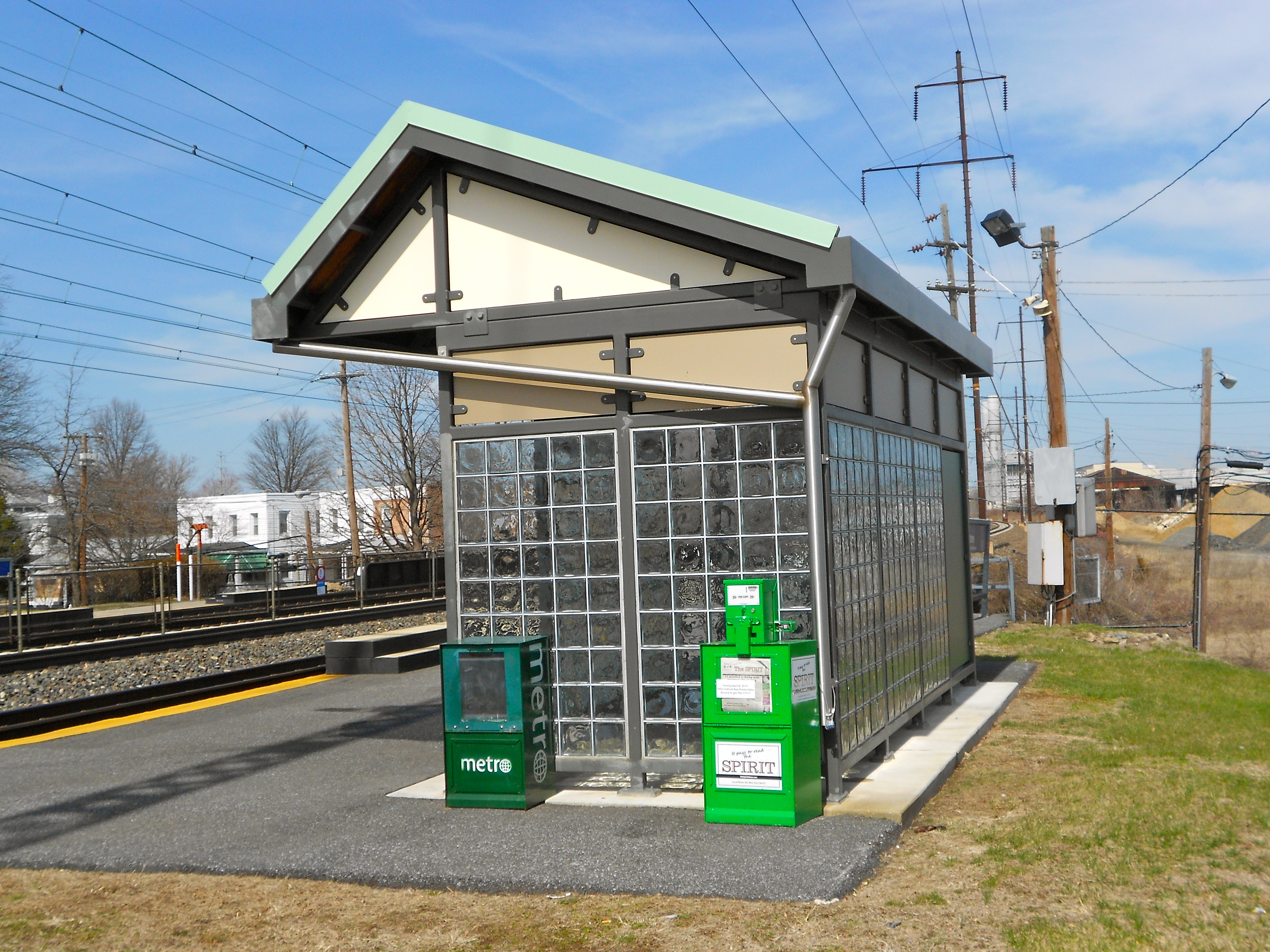
Eddystone SEPTA station

Eddystone Station is a SEPTA train station on the Wilmington/Newark Line. Eddystone is served by SEPTA bus route 37, providing service to Philadelphia International Airport and South Philadelphia, and bus route 114 serving Chester transportation center and Penn State Brandywine.

== Notable people ==
- Jennifer Aniston, actress
- Margaret Mattson, local landowner known as the witch of Ridley Creek
- Samuel K. McConnell Jr. (1901-1985), U.S. Congressman

== Bibliography ==
- Westing, Frederick (1966), The locomotives that Baldwin built. Containing a complete facsimile of the original "History of the Baldwin Locomotive Works, 1831-1923", Crown Publishing Group, ISBN 978-0-517-36167-2, LCCN 66025422.
