= Eddystone Arsenal =

Eddystone Arsenal was a Baldwin Locomotive Works subsidiary located in Eddystone, Pennsylvania that produced military hardware for the Allies of World War I. As orders from combatants exceeded the production capacity of Baldwin's Philadelphia factory, new manufacturing facilities were built in Eddystone, Pennsylvania. When the first world war ended, this manufacturing complex was used for locomotive manufacturing as Baldwin's Eddystone Plant.

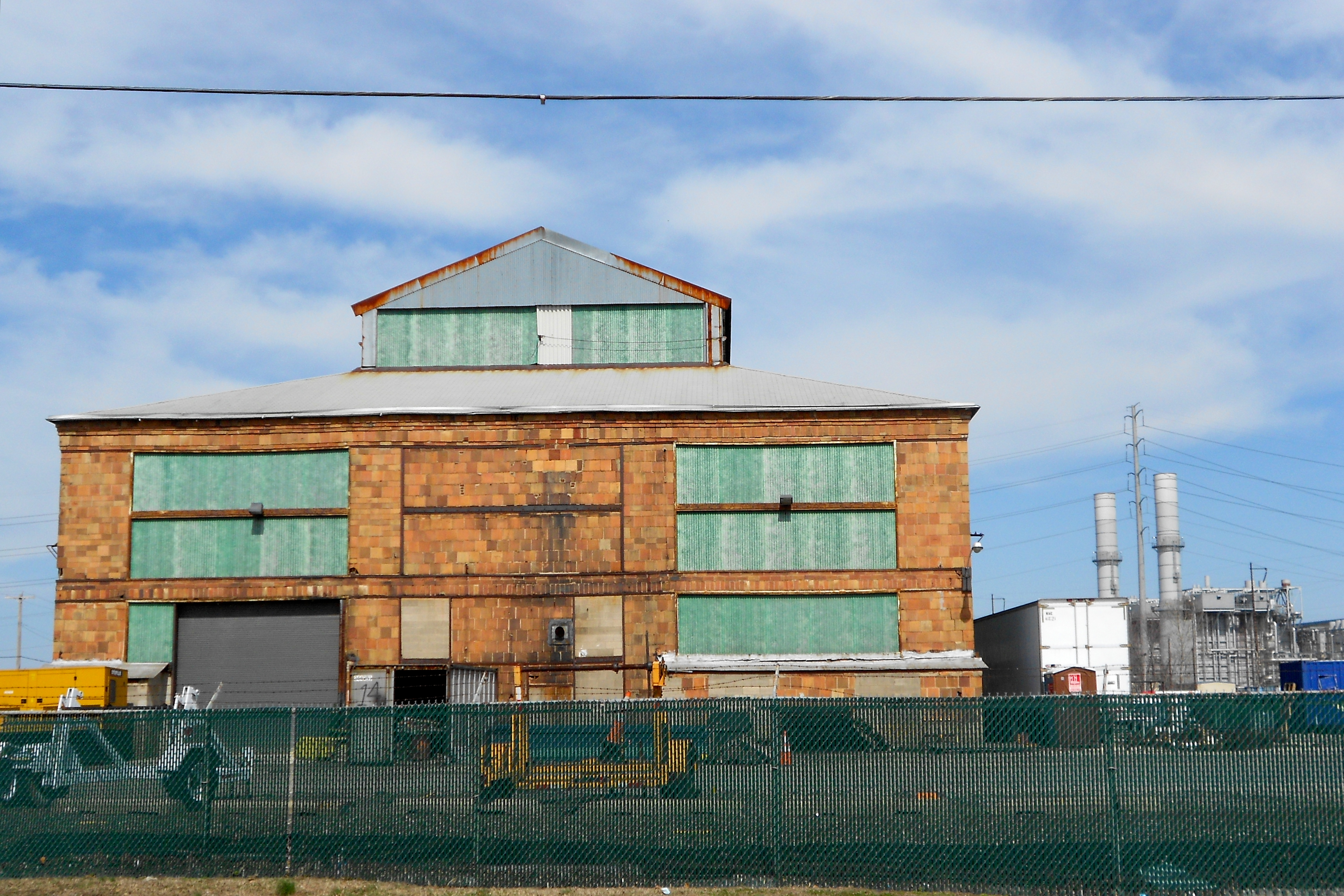
Gunstock manufacturing building of the former Eddystone Rifle Plant

== Wartime locomotive orders ==
Baldwin received locomotive orders from Imperial Russia, France, and the United Kingdom of Great Britain and Ireland as those nations' manufacturing facilities were refocused on armaments production. Baldwin's vice president Samuel M. Vauclain visited Russia in 1914 to obtain orders for thirty 0-6-6-0 Mallet locomotives for the 3 ft 6 in gauge railways between Arkhangelsk and Vologda. This was followed by orders for 2-10-0 Russian gauge locomotives and 75 cm gauge gasoline locomotives for Russian trench railways. France ordered more than one-thousand trench railway locomotives, and the United Kingdom ordered 495 trench railway locomotives and 465 locomotives for standard-gauge railways.

== Eddystone Ammunition Corporation ==
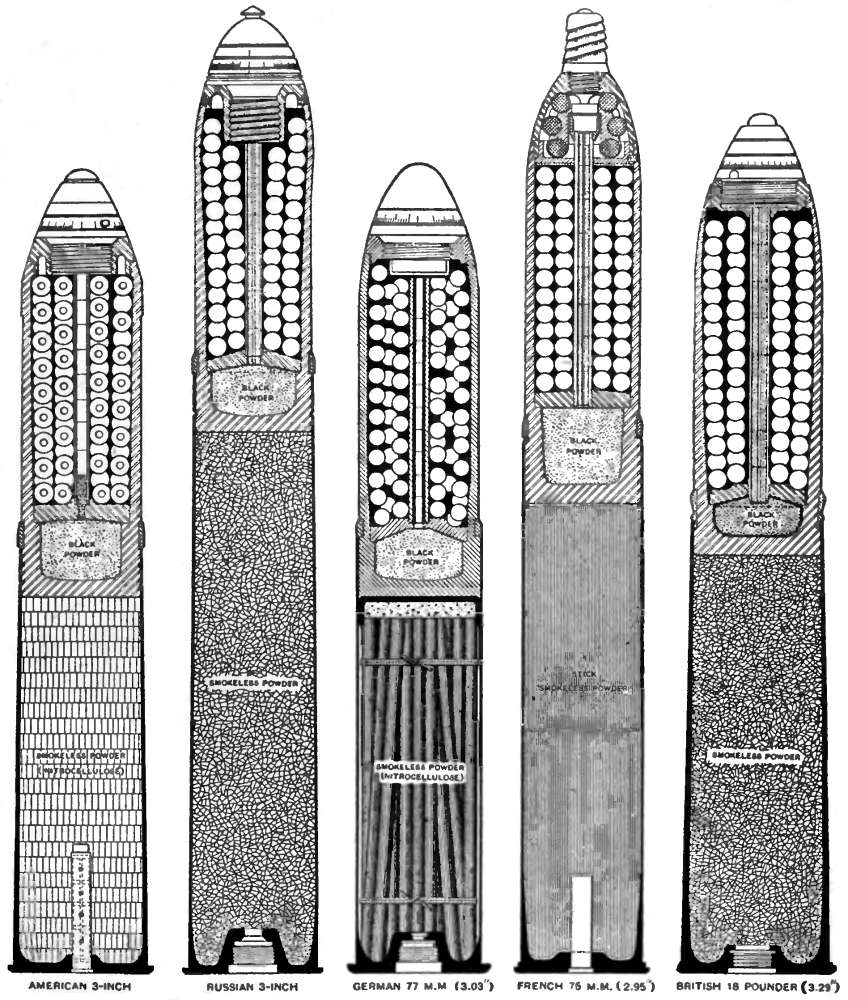
The Eddystone Ammunition Corporation was formed to manufacture the type of shell 2nd from the left.

France and the United Kingdom then placed orders with Baldwin for artillery shells of calibers from 12 centimetres (4.7 in) to 12 inches (30 cm). Although Baldwin's Philadelphia plant was enlarged to include a 4-story extension to the truck shop and a new 8-story building, completion of ammunition orders required construction of new manufacturing facilities at Eddystone, where Baldwin had been operating a shop since 1905. Baldwin formed the Eddystone Ammunition Corporation on 10 June 1915 to manufacture 2,500,000 3-inch (76 mm) shrapnel shells of Russian design. The Eddystone Ammunition plant adjacent to the Delaware River was operational by November 1915 including a modern wharf along the river front. This plant was the source of the Eddystone explosion which killed 133 people on 10 April 1917. Another Baldwin subsidiary, the Eddystone Munitions Company, was organized on 27 September 1917 to manufacture shrapnel for the United States government. Total production was 6,565,355 artillery shells before the plant was converted to locomotive shops in 1919.

== Eddystone Rifle Plant ==
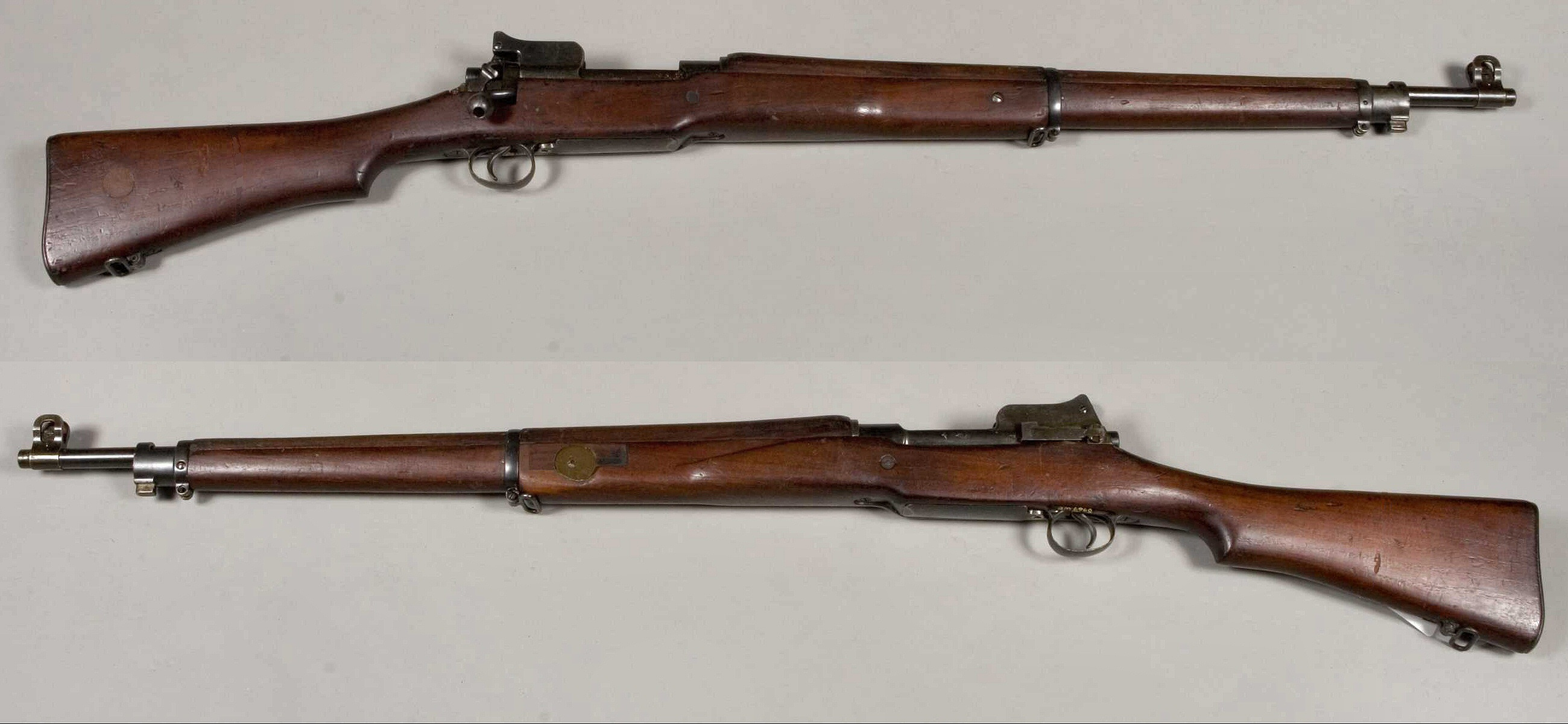
The Eddystone Rifle Plant was built to manufacture these Pattern 1914 Enfield rifles.

On 30 April 1915 the United Kingdom placed a contract with Remington Arms for 1,500,000 Pattern 1914 Enfield rifles. When Remington subcontracted the bulk of this order to Baldwin, Baldwin built a 14-acre (5.7 ha) rifle plant at Eddystone, the largest factory in the United States during World War I. This Eddystone Rifle Plant began production on 31 December 1915 with 10,000 machines powered by 424,000 feet (129,000 m) of belting from 40,200 feet (12,300 m) of line shafts. The rifle plant employed 15,294 workers, with women accounting for 20 percent of the peak work force, manufacturing up to 6,000 rifles per day. Rifle plant operations ceased on 11 January 1919 after producing 1,959,954 rifles with spare parts equivalent to 200,000 more rifles. Contract changes resulted in most rifles being completed to the modified M1917 Enfield design, which was carried by nearly two-thirds of the American Expeditionary Forces.
