= John K. Hagerty =

American politician

Member of the Pennsylvania House of Representatives from the Delaware County district
- In office 1921–1922

Personal details
- Born: November 8, 1867 Upland, Pennsylvania
- Died: November 18, 1945 (aged 78) Chester, Pennsylvania
- Resting place: Chester Rural Cemetery, Chester, Pennsylvania
- Party: Republican

John K. Hagerty (November 8, 1867 – November 18, 1945) was an American politician from Pennsylvania who served as a Republican member of the Pennsylvania House of Representatives for Delaware County from 1921 to 1922.

== Early life ==
Hagerty was born in Upland, Pennsylvania. He worked as a machinist at the John Wetherill Manufacturing Company and as chief engineer and master mechanic at the Eddystone Manufacturing Company.

== Career ==
Hagerty was elected to the Chester City Council and served from 1907 to 1918. He was the superintendent of Public Safety for Chester from 1914 to 1918 and school tax collector from 1918 to 1920.

Hagerty was elected to the Pennsylvania House of Representatives for Delaware County and served from 1921 to 1922. He was not a candidate for reelection for the 1923 House term.

He served as postmaster for the United States Postal Service for the Chester post office from 1923 to 1935.

He died in Chester, Pennsylvania, and is interred at the Chester Rural Cemetery.
