= St. Martin's Church (Marcus Hook, Pennsylvania) =

Historic Episcopal church and cemetery

Coordinates: 39.814643°N 75.411191°W

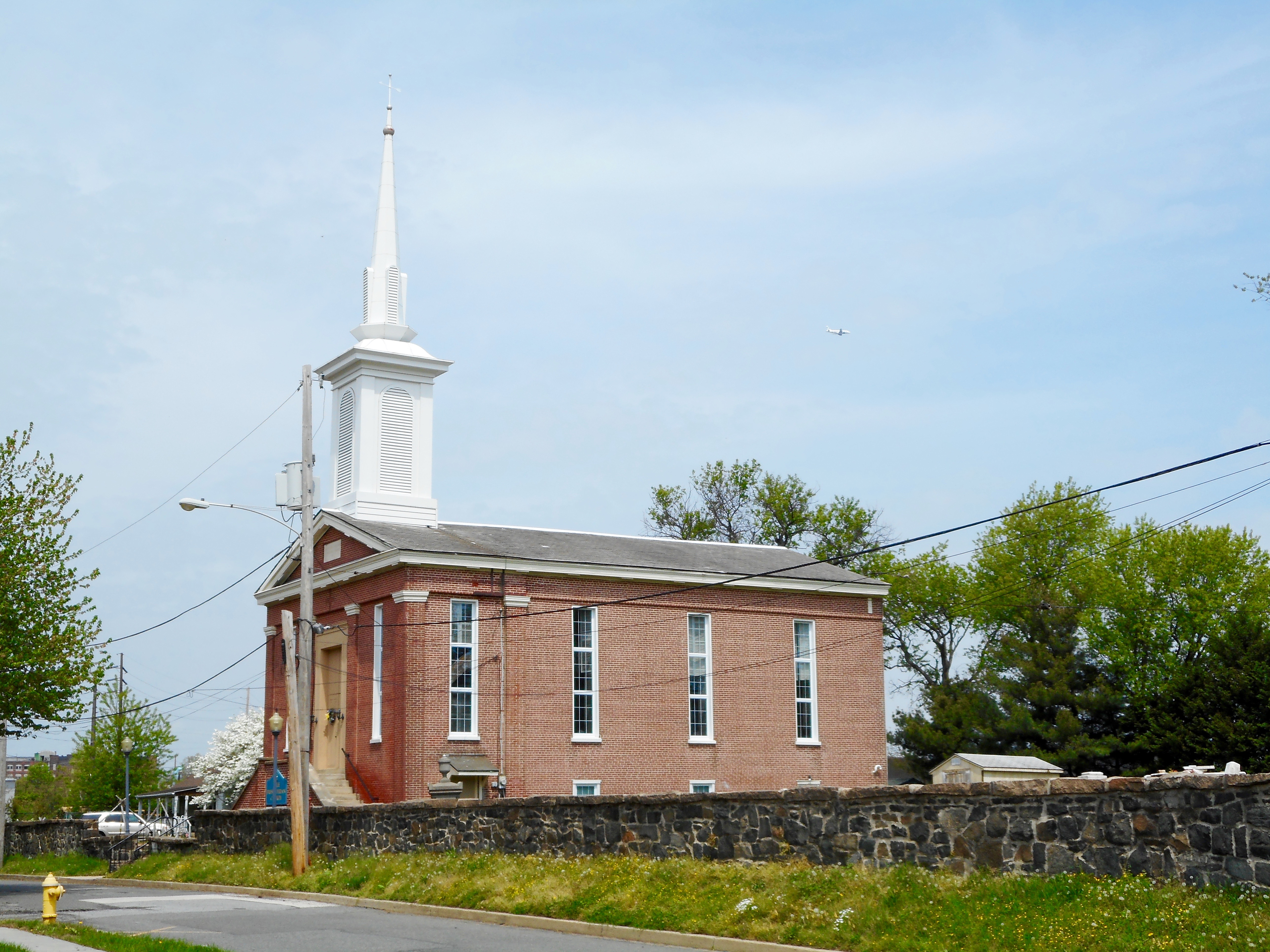
1845 building, now housing the Bible Presbyterian Church of Marcus Hook

St. Martin's Church is an Episcopal church founded in 1699 in Marcus Hook, Pennsylvania, United States. It is located at 22 Church Street, only 500 feet from the Delaware River. It is one of the earliest and last riverfront churches in Pennsylvania. The cemetery at St. Martin's Church contains a memorial commemorating war veterans from the Revolutionary War, the War of 1812, the Mexican–American War, the American Civil War, and the Spanish–American War who are buried in the cemetery.

== History ==
St. Martin's Church was founded in 1699 by Walter Martin of Upper Chichester, Pennsylvania as an alternative place of worship and burial for non-Quakers. Martin was a Quaker, however he became embittered against the "Religious Society of Friends". On December 18, 1699, Martin donated one and half acres of land to the town and inhabitants of Marcus Hook for a church and burial place. In the deed, he included the restriction that "Quakers and reputed Quakers only excepted". The church was originally named the Chapel at Chichester.

In 1702, a rude frame building that was previously used as a blacksmith shop was purchased for 5 pounds, moved to the church property and church services began.

St. Martin's Church was originally part of the parish of St. Paul's in Chester, Pennsylvania along with St. John's Church in Concord, Pennsylvania. In 1704, Reverend Henry Nichols was sent by The Society of the Propagation of the Gospel in Foreign Parts to preach in all three churches.

Missionaries were sent from Philadelphia to preach to the congregation, however problems arose due to the distance the preachers had to travel and the church began to have ministers from the Swedish Church in Wilmington, Delaware preside over the congregation.

By 1745 the congregation had outgrown the original, old frame building and funds were raised to build a small brick church approximately 12 feet by 16 feet. The old frame church building remained on the property and was used as the first school in Marcus Hook. The school remained open until 1860 when a new brick schoolhouse was built elsewhere and the old frame church building was demolished.

In 1760, the church name was changed from Chapel at Chichester to St. Martin's in honor of the founder Walter Martin at the suggestion of Emmanuel Grubb, son of John Grubb, a two-term member of the Pennsylvania Provincial Assembly and one of the original settlers of the Brandywine Hundred which became Claymont, Delaware.

In 1822, St. Martin's Church separated from St. Paul's parish of Chester and became a separate organization.

In 1845, the church was rebuilt with the current building.

In 1967, the parishioners outgrew the church and built a new place of worship at 700 Meetinghouse Road in Boothwyn, Pennsylvania.

In 1979, the church was designated a Local Historic Landmark by the Marcus Hook Borough Council.

In 1985, the church and cemetery were obtained by The Marcus Hook Community Development Corporation and renovated to be historically accurate. The building has been leased out to different church congregations and is currently used by the Bible Presbyterian Church of Marcus Hook.

== Cemetery ==
The cemetery at St. Martin's Church contains about 500 graves dating as far back as the 1700s.

=== Soldier and Sailor Walk Memorial ===
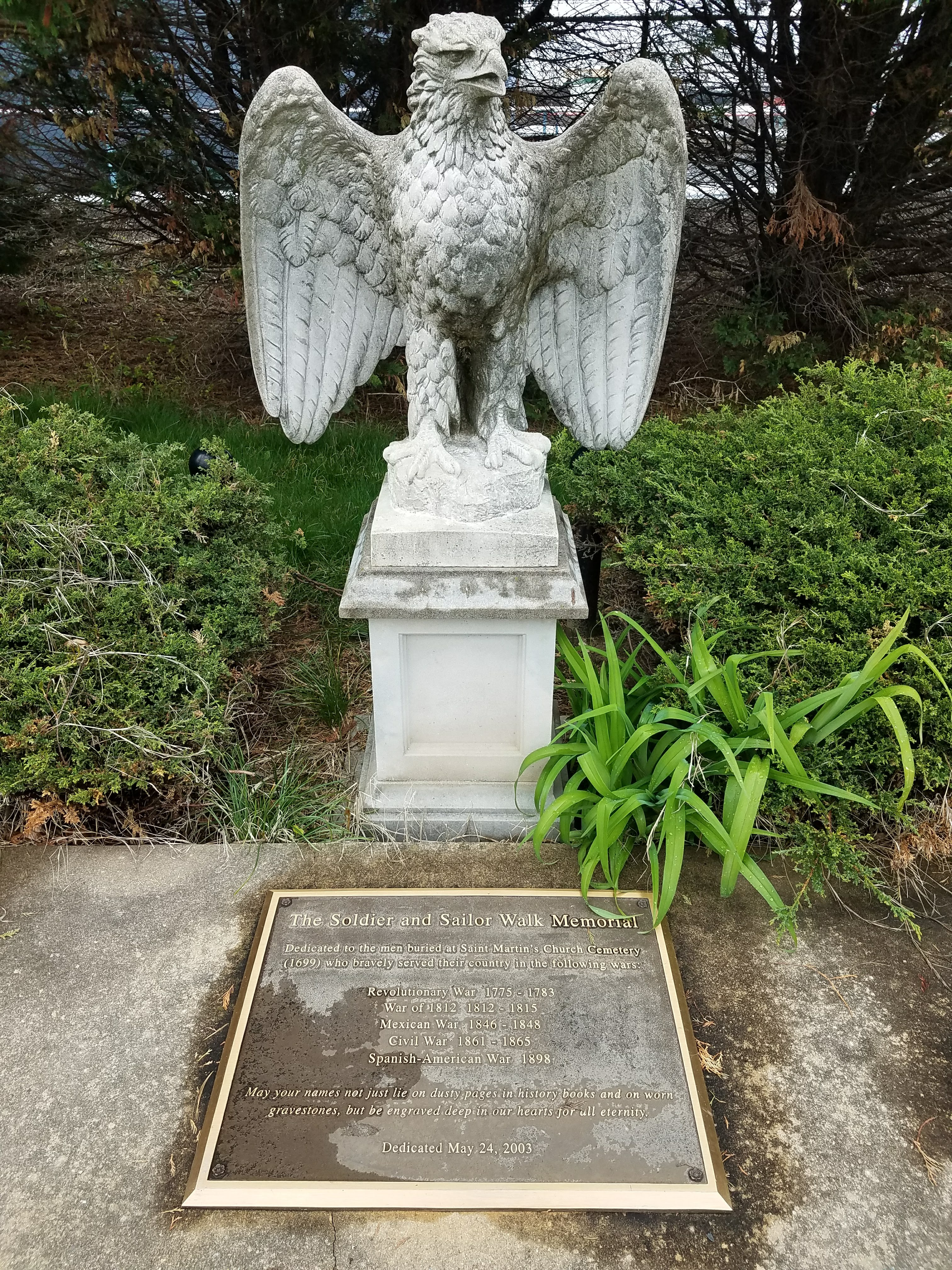
Soldier and Sailor Walk Memorial at St. Martin's Church in Marcus Hook, PA

At the cemetery's back end is the Soldier and Sailors Walk Memorial commemorating 73 soldiers buried in the cemetery. The memorial was dedicated on May 24, 2003 by the Marcus Hook Community Development Corporation. The memorial consists of a section of headstones commemorating soldiers from five different wars: "the Revolutionary War, the War of 1812, the Mexican War, the Civil War and the Spanish–American War". All the soldiers included in the memorial are honorably discharged and fully documented.

At the center of the walk is a white eagle statue and bronze plaque that reads:

"Dedicated to the men buried at St. Martin's Church Cemetery (1699) who served their country in the following wars.

- Revolutionary War 1775–1783
- War of 1812 1812–1815
- Mexican War 1846–1848
- Civil War 1861–1865
- Spanish–American War 1898

"May your names not just lie on dusty pages in history books and on worn gravestones, but be engraved deep in our hearts for all eternity.''"

== Notable people associated with St. Martin's Church ==
- Israel Acrelius, the noted Swedish Lutheran missionary and priest is known to have preached at St. Martin's Church during his travels in America in 1749.
- John Grubb (1652–1708), member of the Pennsylvania Provincial Assembly and one of the original settlers of the Brandywine Hundred that became Claymont, Delaware is buried at St. Martin's Church
- John Larkin, Jr., businessman and first mayor of Chester, donated two acres of land adjacent to the church in 1879 for use as a cemetery.
- David Trainer (1814–1890), wealthy textile manufacturer, owner of Linwood Mills and director/president of the Delaware County National Bank was a churchwarden at St. Martin's Church
