= M1917 Enfield =

US Rifle, Model of 1917, Caliber 30
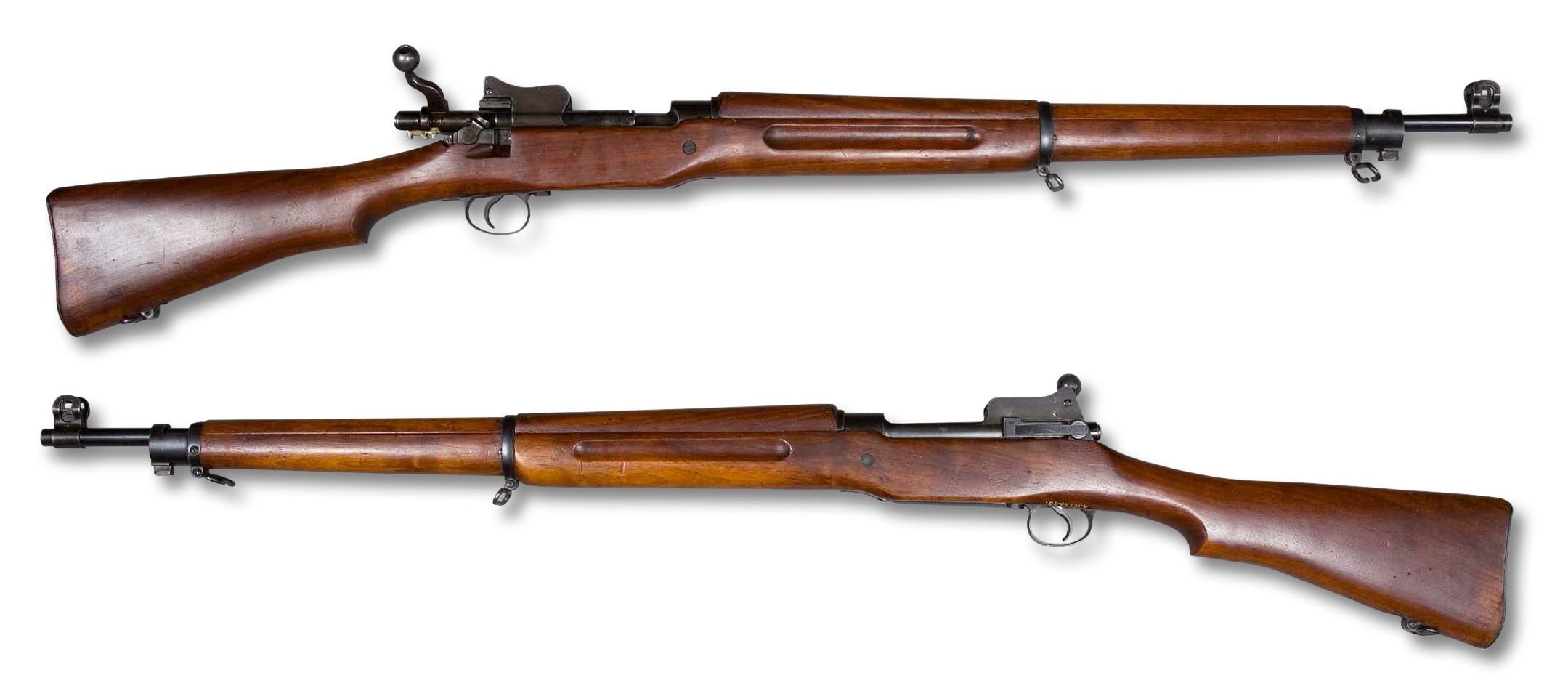
- M1917 Enfield rifle from the collections of Armémuseum, Stockholm, Sweden
- Type: Bolt-action rifle
- Place of origin: United States

Service history
- In service: 1917–1945 (U.S. Service); 1917–present
- Used by: See Users
- Wars: World War I Banana Wars; Spanish Civil War; World War II; First Indochina War; Chinese Civil War; Korean War; Hukbalahap Rebellion; 1958 Lebanon crisis Annexation of Goa; Portuguese Colonial War; Vietnam War (limited); Laotian Civil War (limited); Lebanese Civil War (limited); Soviet–Afghan War

Production history
- Designed: 1917
- Manufacturer: Winchester Repeating Arms Company; Remington Arms; Eddystone Arsenal
- Produced: 1917–1919
- No. built: 2,193,429 total
- Variants: Remington Model 30

Specifications
- Mass: 9.187 lb (4.167 kg) (empty)
- Length: 46.3 in (1,180 mm)
- Barrel length: 26 in (660 mm)
- Cartridge: .30-06 Springfield (7.62×63mm); 7×57mm Mauser (Remington Model 1934); 7.92×57mm Mauser (Modified by European arms dealers during the Spanish Civil War)
- Action: Modified Mauser type bolt-action
- Muzzle velocity: 2,800 ft/s (853 m/s) with Cartridge .30 M2 Ball
- Effective firing range: 550 m (601 yd) with iron sights
- Maximum firing range: 5,500 yd (5,029 m) with .30 M1 Ball cartridge
- Feed system: 6-round magazine 5-round stripper clip
- Sights: Iron sights

The M1917 Enfield, the "American Enfield", formally named "United States Rifle, cal .30, Model of 1917" is an American modification and production of the .303-inch (7.7 mm) Pattern 1914 Enfield (P14) rifle (listed in British Service as Rifle No. 3), which was developed and manufactured during the period 1917–1918. Numerically, it was the main rifle used by the American Expeditionary Forces in Europe during World War I. The Danish Sirius Dog Sled Patrol in Greenland still use the M1917, which performs reliably in Arctic conditions, as their service weapon.

== History ==
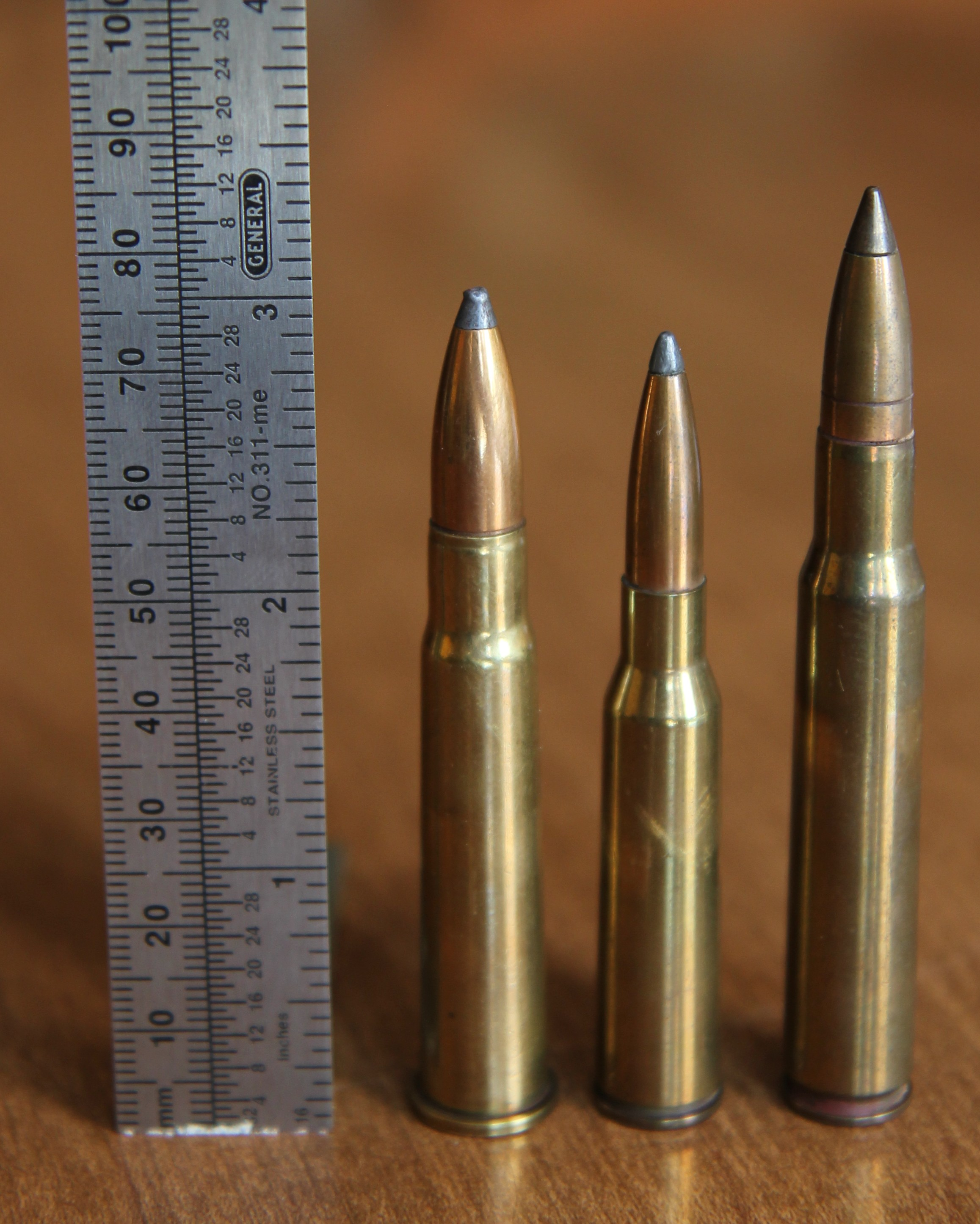
Left to right: .303 British, 6.5×50mmSR Arisaka, and .30-06 Springfield soft point ammunition

.276 Enfield (7×60mm) rimless bottlenecked rifle cartridge for which the action was originally designed.

.30-06 Springfield (7.62×63mm) rifle cartridge for which the M1917 Enfield was adapted.

Before World War I, the British had the Short Magazine Lee–Enfield (SMLE) as their main rifle. Compared to the German Mausers or U.S. 1903 Springfield, the SMLE's .303 rimmed cartridge, originally a black powder cartridge, was ill-suited for feeding in magazine or belt-fed weapons and the SMLE was thought to be less accurate than its competition at longer ranges. The long-range accuracy of the German 7×57mm Mauser Model 1895 in the hands of Boer marksmen during the Boer War (1899-1902) made an impression on the British Army, and a more powerful, modern rifle was desired. Thus, even though improved Lee–Enfield variants (the SMLE) and .303 British Mark VII ammunition with pointed (spitzer) projectiles entered service after the Boer War in 1910, a committee was formed to develop an entirely new design of rifle and cartridge. The starting point was to copy many of the features of the Mauser system. The rifle was developed at the Royal Small Arms Factory at Enfield (arsenal) in the United Kingdom.

This development named the Pattern 1913 Enfield or P13, included a front locking, dual lug bolt action with Mauser type claw extractor as well as a new, powerful rimless .276 Enfield cartridge. The design carried over a Lee–Enfield type safety at the rear of the action and a bolt that cocked on closing to ease unlocking of the bolt during rapid fire. An advanced design, for the era, of aperture rear sight and a long sight radius were incorporated to maximize accuracy potential. Ease of manufacture was also an important criterion. However, the onset of World War I came too quickly for the UK to put it into production before the new cartridge could be perfected, as it suffered from overheating in rapid fire and bore fouling.

As it entered World War I, the UK had an urgent need for rifles, and contracts for the new rifle were placed with arms companies in the United States. They decided to ask these companies to produce the new rifle design in the old .303 British chambering for convenience of ammunition logistics. The new rifle was termed the "Pattern 14". In the case of the P14 rifle, Winchester and Remington were selected. A third manufacturer, Eddystone Arsenal – a subsidiary of Remington – was tooled up at the Baldwin Locomotive Works in Eddystone, Pennsylvania. Thus, three variations of the P14 and M1917 exist, labeled "Winchester," "Remington" or "Eddystone".

=== World War I ===
When the U.S. entered the war, it had a similar need for rifles. The Springfield Armory had delivered approximately 843,000 M1903 Springfield rifles, but due to the difficulties in production, rather than re-tool the Pattern 14 factories to produce the standard U.S. rifle, the M1903 Springfield, it was realized that it would be much quicker to adapt the British design. Although it might have been faster to retain chambering for the .303 British military cartridge, the design was modified for the U.S. .30-06 Springfield cartridge to simplify ammunition logistics. The Enfield design was well suited to the .30-06 Springfield; it was a big, strong action and was originally intended to employ a long, powerful, rimless bottlenecked cartridge. Accordingly, Remington Arms Co. altered the design for caliber .30-06 Springfield, under the close supervision of the U.S. Army Ordnance Department, which was formally adopted as the U.S. Rifle, Caliber .30, Model of 1917. In addition to Remington's production at Ilion, New York and Eddystone, Pennsylvania, Winchester produced the rifle at their New Haven, Connecticut plant, a combined total more than twice the 1903's production, and was the unofficial service rifle. Eddystone made 1,181,908 rifles – more than the production of Remington (545,541 rifles) and Winchester (465,980 rifles) combined. Although standardization with interchangeable parts was intended, early Winchester rifles (including the first five-thousand with a simple W on the receiver rather than Winchester) used slightly differing parts, causing interchangeability issues with the rifles produced by Remington and Eddystone until Winchester corrected the problem in later production.

Design changes were few; the stripper clip feed, internal box magazine, bolt face, chamber and rifling dimensions were altered to suit the .30-06 Springfield cartridge and the US pattern 5-round stripper clips, the stock was slightly redesigned, lightening it somewhat, and the volley fire sights on the left side of the weapon were deleted. The markings were changed to reflect the model and caliber change. A 16.5-inch blade bayonet, the M1917 bayonet was produced for use on the rifle; it was later used on several other small arms including the M97 and M12 trench shotguns.

The new rifle was used alongside the M1903 Springfield, and quickly surpassed the Springfield design in numbers produced and units issued. By November 11, 1918, about 75% of the AEF in France were armed with M1917s.

An M1917 Enfield rifle was used by Sergeant Alvin C. York on October 8, 1918, during the event for which he was awarded the Medal of Honor, as the U.S. 82nd Division's (which York was a part of) official history states the division had been issued the M1917 (Eddystone), then replaced them with the No 1 Mk III Lee-Enfield while training with the British in the north of France, then were reissued M1917 rifles (Eddystone). According to his diary, Sergeant York also used a Colt M1911 semi-automatic pistol on that day. (The film Sergeant York starring Gary Cooper in the title role, had York using an M1903 Springfield and a German Luger pistol.)

After the armistice, most M1917 rifles were placed in storage, although Chemical Mortar units continued to be issued them. During the 1920s and 1930s, many M1917 rifles were released for civilian use through the NRA, or were sold as surplus. Many were "sporterized", sometimes including rechambering to more powerful magnum hunting cartridges, such as .300 H&H Magnum and .300 Winchester Magnum. It was so popular as a sporting weapon that Remington manufactured about 30,000 new rifles as the Model 30 from 1921 to 1940. In 1934, Honduras procured a version of the rifle chambered for 7×57mm known as Model 1934.

=== World War II ===
At the time of the American entry into World War II, the U.S. Army was still issuing the M1917 to chemical mortarmen. Perhaps due to M1 Garand (or M1903A3) shortages at the start of the war, the M1917 was also issued to artillerymen, and both mortarmen and artillerymen carried the M1917 in North Africa. Lieutenant Colonel Charles E. Peterson (USAR, retired; 1920–2005), a Major in the 101st Airborne in the Normandy action, reported seeing some M1917 rifles issued to rear-echelon U.S. troops in France during World War II. Other M1917 rifles were issued to the Philippine Commonwealth Army and Philippine Constabulary. After the fall of the Philippines, M1917 rifles were used by Japanese police forces as well as by U.S. and Filipino soldiers with the local guerrillas before the liberation of the Philippines. These rifles were also used by the Hukbalahap.

Before and during World War II, stored rifles were reconditioned for use as reserve, training and Lend-Lease weapons; these rifles are identified by having refinished metal (sandblasted and Parkerized) and sometimes replacement wood (often birch). Some of these rifles were reconditioned with new bolts manufactured by the United Shoe Machinery Company that were stamped “USMC,” leading to the mistaken impression these were United States Marine Corps rifles. Many were bought by the United Kingdom through the British Purchasing Commission for use by the Home Guard; 615,000 arrived in Britain in the summer of 1940, followed by a further 119,000 in 1941. These were prominently marked with a red paint stripe around the stock to avoid confusion with the earlier P14 that used the British .303 round. Others were supplied to the Nationalist Chinese forces, to indigenous forces in the China-Burma-India theater, to Filipino soldiers under the Philippine Army and Constabulary units and the local guerrilla forces and to the Free French Army, which can occasionally be seen in wartime photographs. The M1917 was also issued to the Local Defence Force of the Irish Army during World War II, these were part-time soldiers akin to the British Home Guard. In an ironic reversal of names, in Irish service the M1917 was often referred to as the "Springfield"; presumably since an "Enfield" rifle was assumed to be the standard Irish MkIII Short Magazine Lee–Enfield, while "Springfield" was known to be an American military arsenal. The M1917 was also utilized by multiple state defense forces as issued weapons to guard critical infrastructure against saboteurs and to maintain peacekeeping duties due to the absence of the National Guard. The Georgia State Defense Corps was one of the organizations that predominantly utilized the rifle.

As with all belligerents, Canada entered the Second World War short of small arms to equip its expanding military. 80,000 M1917s, designated “Rifle, Enfield .30/06,” were purchased in July 1940, along with 5,000,000 rounds of .30-06 ammunition. A further 20,000 were purchased in 1941. They were initially allotted to Canadian Army Basic and Advanced Training Centres, the Royal Military College of Canada and Canadian Army (Reserve) units. They would also be issued to the Veterans Guard of Canada, the Pacific Coast Militia Rangers and the Royal Canadian Air Force. The M1917 would fill a critical role in Canada's war effort, freeing .303-calibre weapons for front-line use or to be supplied to the UK after Dunkirk, when Canada provided 75,000 Ross Mark III rifles beginning on 22 May 1940.

The M1917 was supplied to both Denmark and Norway after WWII as an interim weapon prior to the arrival of the M1 Garand.

=== Korean War and after ===
After World War II, the M1917 went out of front-line duty with the US forces. Chinese Communist forces used M1917 rifles during the Korean War. This rifle was also used, unofficially, in small Middle-East and African conflicts as a military-assistance program supplied rifle. Vietcong also modified the M1917 rifles they have.

== Contemporary use ==
The M1917 is used as a ceremonial and drilling rifle, as with the M1903, M1 Garand, and M14. For military purposes, mainly as last resort against aggressive polar bears and muskoxen, the Danish Sirius Dog Sled Patrol (Slædepatruljen Sirius) still use the M1917, designated as Gevær M/53 (17) by the Danish, as their service weapon, due to the high reliability of these bolt-action rifles in the harsh conditions of high Arctic Greenland.

== Design details ==
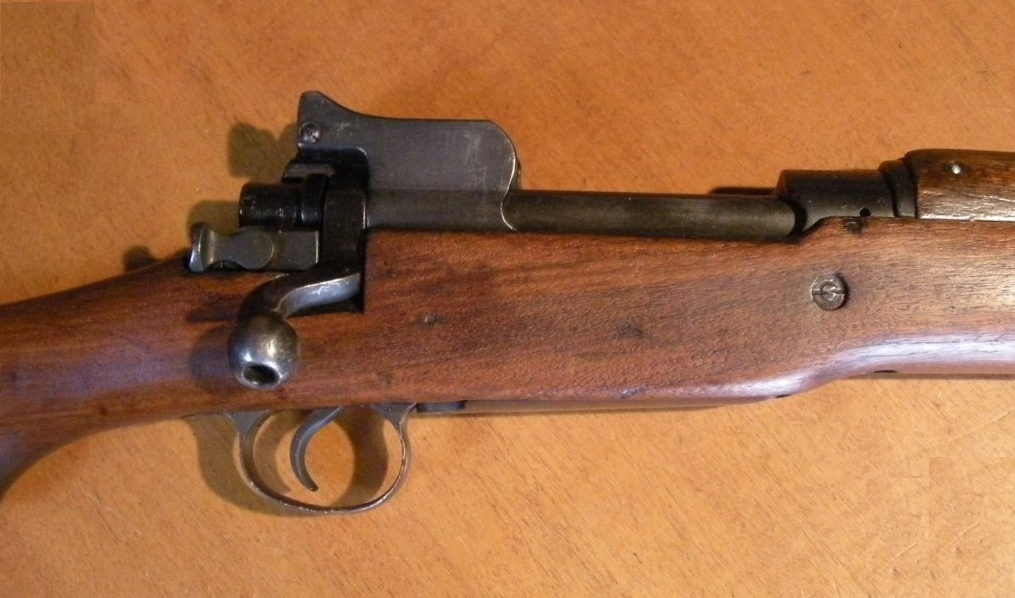
M1917 Enfield breech

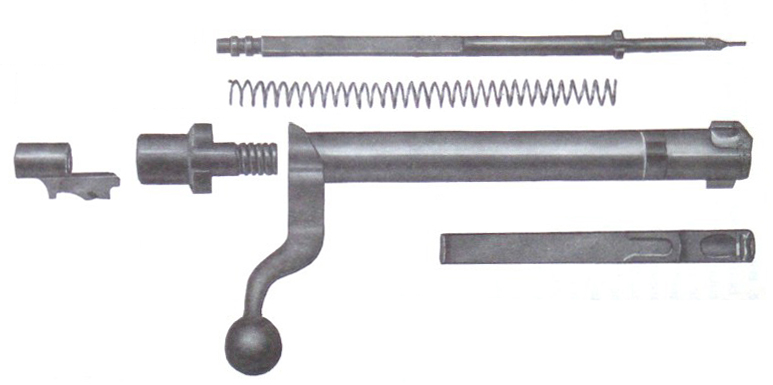
M1917 Mauser M98 type bolt

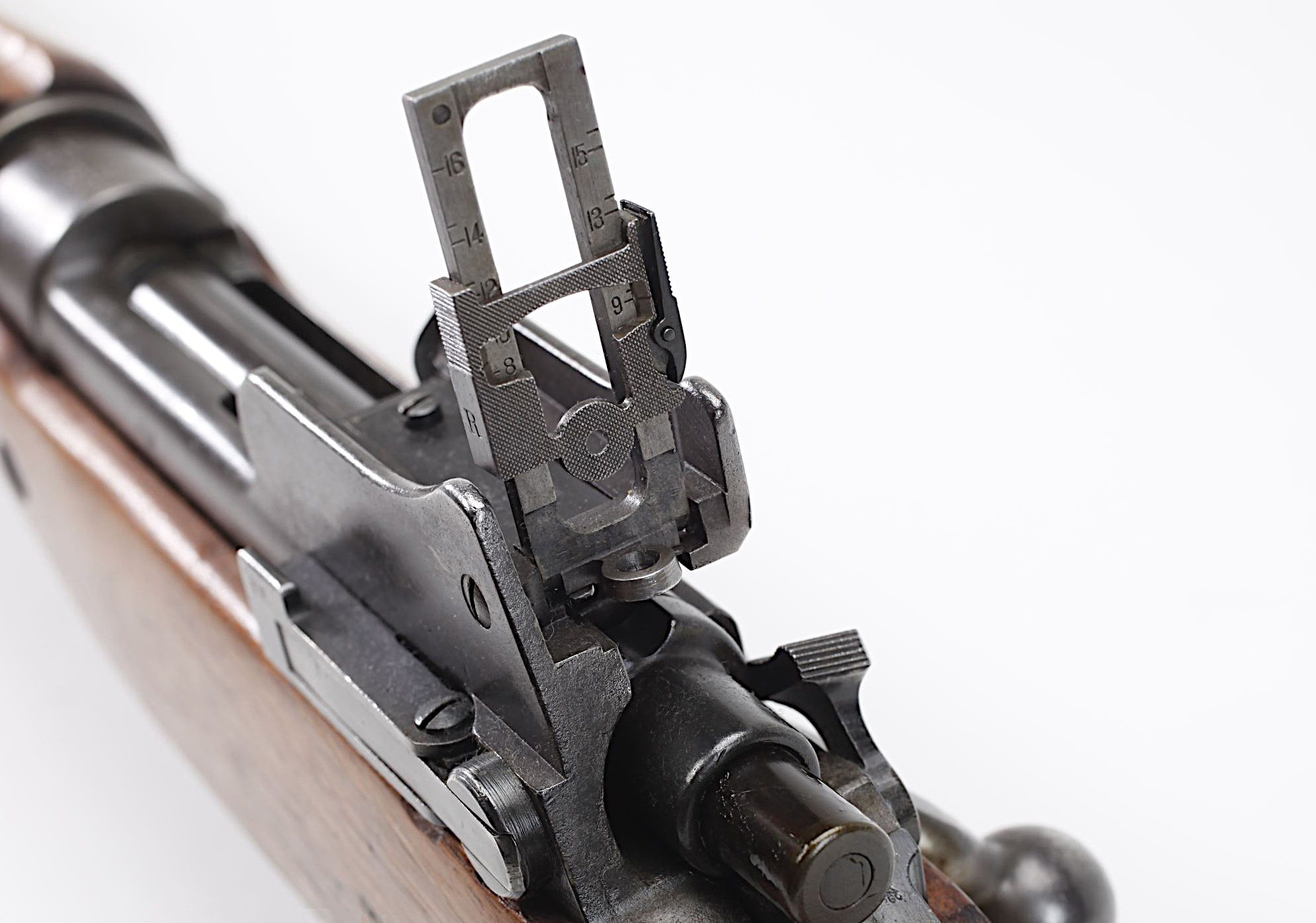
M1917 ladder aperture sight

Due to the original P13 action being designed for a high-powered .276 Enfield round with a larger diameter case than the .30-06 Springfield, the magazine capacity for the smaller diameter .30-06 Springfield was six rounds, although stripper clips held only five cartridges.

Both P14 and M1917 rifles are noted for several design features. The rifle was designed with an iron sight line consisting of rear receiver aperture battle sight calibrated for 400 yd (366 m) with an additional ladder aperture sight that could be flipped up and was calibrated for 200–900 yd (183–823 m) in 100 yd (91 m) increments and 900–1,600 yd (823–1,463 m) in 50 yd (46 m) increments. The ladder aperture sight moves vertically on a slide, and hence was not able to correct for wind drift. The rear sight element was protected by sturdy "ears" and proved to be faster and more accurate than the typical mid-barrel sight offered by Mauser, Enfield or the Buffington battle sight of the M1903 Springfield. Future American rifles, such as the M1903A3 Springfield, M1 Garand and M1 carbine, would all use similar rear sights. The front sighting element consisted of a wing-protected front post, and was adjusted laterally and locked into position during assembly at the arsenal. The M1917 rear sight element was situated on an elongated receiver bridge, which added weight to the action, as well as lengthening the bolt. The M1917 has a 31.76 in (806.7 mm) sight radius. The battle sight radius is slightly shorter at 31.69 in (804.9 mm). The M1917 action weighs 58 oz (1,644 g) versus 45 oz (1,276 g) for the M1903 Springfield.

The rifle maintains the British cock-on-closing feature, in which the bolt's mainspring is loaded and the rifle cocked as part of the return stroke of the bolt, which aided rapid fire, especially as the action heated up. Most bolt action designs after the Mauser 98 cocked as part of the opening stroke. The rifle has a characteristic "belly" due to a deeper magazine, allowing the rifle to hold six rounds of the US .30-06 cartridge in the magazine, and one in the chamber. The M1917 Enfield like the Mauser Gewehr 98 had no magazine cut-off mechanism, which when engaged permits the feeding and extraction of single cartridges only while keeping the cartridges in the magazine in reserve. In a manufacturing change from the Mauser 98 and the derivative Springfield, the bolt is not equipped with a third 'safety' lug. Instead, as on the earlier Model 1895 (Chilean) Mauser, the bolt handle recesses into a notch in the receiver, which serves as an emergency locking lug in the event of failure of the frontal locking lugs. This change saved machine time needed on the rifle bolt, cutting costs and improving production rates, and this alteration has since been adopted by many commercial bolt-action rifle designs for the same reasons. The unusual 'dog-leg' shaped bolt handle is low profile and places the bolt knob just rearwards of the trigger close to the firer's hand, facilitating rapid cycling and fire. Like the Lee–Enfield, P13 and P14, the safety falls under the firer's thumb and can be operated silently. The M1917 Enfield bolt locking lugs had a 4 degree helical angle with matching angles on the receiver lug seats (the technical term is interrupted threading). This means that final head space is not achieved until the bolt handle is turned down all the way. The design probably used helical locking lugs to allow for chambering imperfect or dirty ammunition and that the closing cam action is distributed over the entire mating faces of both bolt and receiver lugs. This is one reason the bolt closure feels smooth. The angled lugs had no tendency to unwind with chamber pressure since the "angle of repose" of smooth, lubricated steel surfaces is approximately 8 degrees. One advantage was that when the bolt handle was turned up the lugs cleared each other immediately so full effort was applied to the extraction cam. The trigger had a mechanical interlock to prevent firing unless the bolt was fully locked. The location of the safety on the right rear of the receiver has also been copied by most sporting bolt-action rifles since, as it falls easily under the firer's thumb. The trigger pull is ≥ 3 lb_{f} (13.3 N). One notable design flaw was the leaf spring that powered the ejector, which could break off and render the ejector inoperable. A combat-expedient repair method was to slip a bit of rubber under the bolt stop spring. A redesigned ejector, incorporating a small coil spring in place of the fragile leaf spring, was developed and can be fitted to the M1917 to remedy this issue.

The M1917 was well-suited to the rimless .30-06 Springfield round which came closer in overall length and muzzle energy to the original .276 Enfield high-velocity round for which the rifle had been designed than the rimmed, less powerful .303 British round of the P14. The M1917's barrel had a 1 in 10 in (254 mm) twist rate and retained the 5-groove left hand twist Enfield-type rifling of the P14, in contrast to the 4-groove right hand twist rifling of the M1903 Springfield and other US designed arms. The M1917 had a long 26-inch heavyweight barrel compared to the lighter 24-inch barrel of the M1903 Springfield. With the longer sighting plane, the M1917 proved generally more accurate at long distances than the M1903, at the expense of greater weight. The M1917 weighed 9 lb 3 oz (4.17 kg) empty – the M1903 Springfield weighed 8 lb 11 oz (3.94 kg) empty – and a rifle with sling, oiler, and fixed bayonet weighed over 11 lb (4.99 kg). The M1917's long barrel and issued 16.5 in (419 mm) blade bayonet proved too lengthy and cumbersome for trench fighting, while its weight and overall length made the rifle difficult to use for some smaller-statured soldiers. During World War I the average height of United States soldiers was 5 ft 7.5 in (1.71 m).

Many M1917 Enfield rifles were refurbished during World War II with newly manufactured High Standard barrels with 4-groove rifling and Johnson Automatics barrels which had 2-groove rifling.

== Variants ==
The M1917 action made from nickel-steel proved very strong, and was used as the basis for a variety of commercial and gunsmith-made sporting rifles in standard and magnum calibers between the world wars and after. Later, Remington Arms redesigned the M1917, removing the "ears" and changing it to cock-on-open, to become the Remington Model 30 series of rifles in the interwar period, which were produced from leftover receivers and barrels.

During the Great Depression Model 30s were not selling well, and the company decided to develop a M1917 derivative targeted to Central and South American militaries. This found only one buyer in Honduras, where strongman general T. C. Andino elected in 1932 started a military modernization program. Remington Model 1934 rifles based on Model 30 actions with M1917 leftover parts, but fitted with a Mauser-type V sight, more familiar for soldiers using Honduran Mauser Model 1895 already in service, were produced in 7×57mm as service rifles for Honduras. In 1934 500 Remington Model 1934 were delivered and in 1935 2,500.

Additional surplus rifles were bought by European arms distributors and converted to 7.92×57mm Mauser, then sold for use in the civil war in Spain during the 1930s.

X Force was the name given to a portion of the Chinese Army equipped and trained by the US during World War II. One of the weapons given to X Force was the M1917 rifle. These rifles were too big for the small-statured Chinese soldiers so the barrels and stocks were shortened from an overall length of 46 inches for the standard M1917 to a 41-inch rifle.

== Users ==
- Afghanistan: Called the "G3" by the Afghan Mujahideen during the Soviet–Afghan War.
- Canada
- Republic of China
- People's Republic of China
- Denmark: Received after 1945 and known as 7.62mm G M/53. Currently in service with the Sirius Dog Sled Patrol in Greenland.
- Ethiopian Empire: received after World War II.
- France: Known as the Fusil à répétition 7 mm 62 (C. 30) M. 17 (Repeating rifle 7.62mm (calibre .30) model 17)
- Haiti: Issued to Gendamerie in the 1930s
- Honduras: Remington Model 1934 variant chambered for 7×57mm
- Japan: Captured during World War II
- North Korea
- Netherlands: 20,000 bought by the Dutch government-in-exile in 1941
- Norway: In 1952 Norway received 24,992 P-17 rifles from Britain in exchange for their inventory of .303 rifles which were acquired during and after WW2.
- Philippines: During World War II, the Philippine Commonwealth Army used the M1917 Enfield, along with the M1903 Springfield and the M1 Garand.
- Portugal: Used by Portuguese colonial troops during the Annexation of Goa and the Portuguese Colonial War.
- South Vietnam
- Spanish Republic
- United Kingdom
- United States: Used by United States Army, United States Marine Corps, and several state defense forces.
- Vietnam: Used by the Việt Minh, some sold by the Nationalist Chinese. Also used by the Viet Cong.
- Laos: Used by the Lao Issara, some sold by the Nationalist Chinese and by the Pathet Lao.

== See also ==
- List of clip-fed firearms
- List of individual weapons of the U.S. Armed Forces
