= Dorothy Chacko =

American social worker, humanitarian and medical doctor

- Born: 1904; Kyoto, Japan
- Died: 30 December 1992 (aged 87–88); Chester, Pennsylvania, USA
- Resting place: Chester Rural Cemetery; 39°51′37″N 75°22′05″W
- Other name: Dorothy Dunning Chacko
- Occupations: Social worker, physician
- Years active: 1932-1992
- Known for: Medical and social service
- Spouse: Joseph Chacko
- Children: Two sons and a daughter
- Parent(s): Morton Dexter Dunning; Mary Ward Dunning
- Awards: Padma Shri; County of Delaware Hall of Fame; GSEP Take the Lead Honour; Smith College Medal.

Dorothy Dunning Chacko (1904 – December 30, 1992) was an American social worker, humanitarian and medical doctor, whose efforts were reported behind the establishment of a lepers' colony at Bethany village, in Ganaur, Sonepat district in the Indian state of Haryana. She was a Hall of Famer of the County of Delaware, Pennsylvania a recipient of the Take the Lead Honour from the Girl Scouts of Eastern Pennsylvania and the Smith College Medal. She was honoured by the Government of India in 1972 with Padma Shri, the fourth highest Indian civilian award.

== Biography ==
We landed in India with 10 rupees, five assorted degrees, two suitcases and a steamer trunk, says Dorothy Chacko, about her relocation to India in 1932.

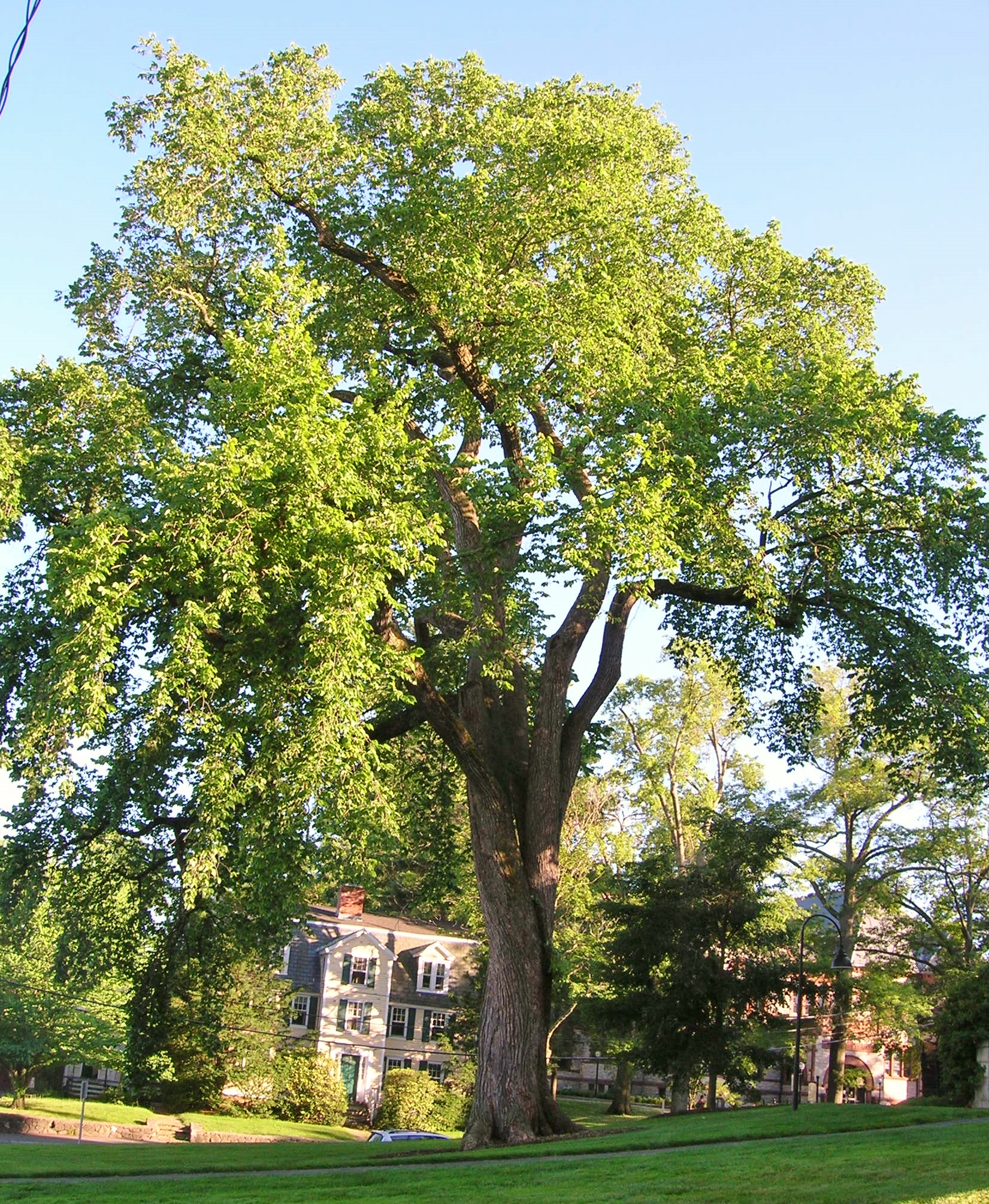
Smith College campus

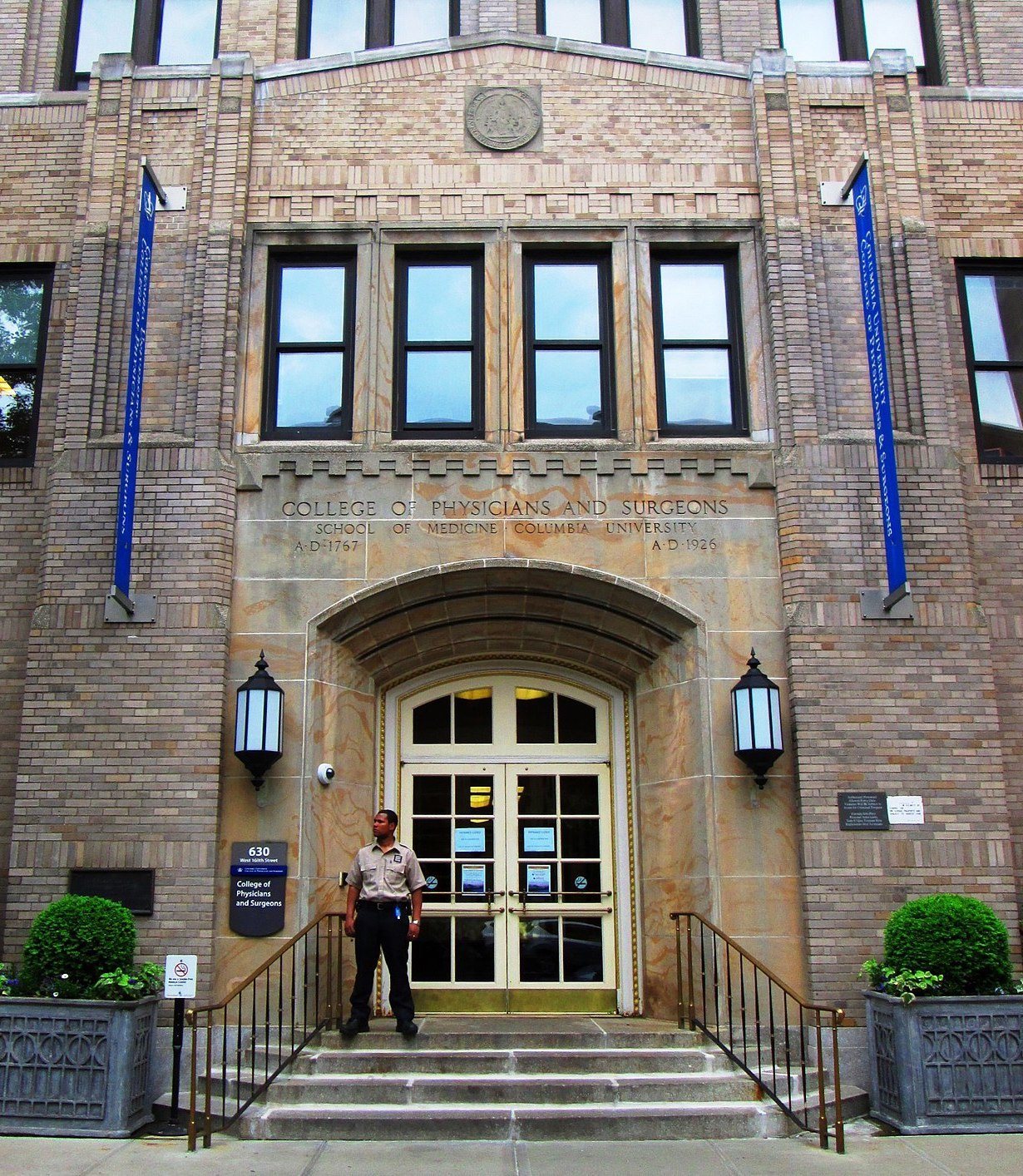
Columbia University College of Physicians and Surgeons entrance

Dorothy Dunning was born in 1904 in Kyoto, Japan to congregational missionary couple, Morton Dexter and Mary Ward Dunning as one among their six children, when they were working in Japan. She did her early schooling there and moving to the US at the age of 16, she completed her school education at the Bradford Academy, Massachusetts in 1921. She did her initial college education at the Smith College in Northampton from where she graduated in 1925, standing first in the examinations. Choosing a career in medicine, she secured a graduate degree in medicine from the Columbia University College of Physicians and Surgeons, New York in 1929 and did her internship at the Metropolitan Hospital Center, New York becoming the first female resident of the hospital. She also passed an advanced course in Hygiene from the London School of Hygiene & Tropical Medicine in 1932.

In 1930, she met the Indian pastor, C. Joseph Chacko, who had come to US (1924) for his doctoral research in international law at the Columbia University and they got married in 1932. She moved to India when Joseph Chacko returned to his home land in June 1932 to join as a faculty member of international law at the University of Punjab. When India got independence in 1947, she acquired Indian citizenship and continued her practice in India.

Chacko spent her early Indian days in Kerala, her husband's native place, and practiced medicine and got involved in social activities. She was one of the founders of Mahila Samajam (Women's forum) for the Church of the East in Kerala which, over the years grew to become a 1000-member organization involved in missionary and social activities. Later, she moved to North India, when Joseph shifted his base there, he would eventually retire as the Professor and the Head of the Department of Political Science from the University of Delhi. There, she helped found a lepers' colony, Bethany Baptists Village Leper Colony, at Ganaur, in Sonepat district in Haryana. Initially she started as a teacher at the Woodstock School, Mussoorie but later, resumed her medical career as the Chief Doctor at the Methodist village clinic, New Delhi and served as the chief medical officer of the World Council of Churches conference took place in New Delhi in 1962. She also headed the board of the Christian Medical College, Ludhiana for a period.

In 1967, Joseph Chacko accepted the post of a visiting professor at the Pennsylvania Military College, (present day Widener University) and Chacko family moved to Chester, Pennsylvania. She continued her medical practice by joining Crozer-Chester Medical Center, Upland as a staff physician at its maternal and infant-care clinics. Here, she co-founded Chester Art Guild to promote art among the Chester residents and was active with Young Women's Christian Association (YWCA) of which she served as the president from 1974 to 1976.

Dorothy Chacko died on 30 December 1992 at her Chester home at the age of 88 and was buried at the Chester Rural Cemetery. Joseph and Dorothy Chacko had three children, eldest son, Joseph Chacko, an engineer based in California, the younger son, John Chacko, a medical doctor practicing in Regina, Canada and the youngest, Mary Russel, working in Hawai as a congregational minister.

== Awards and honours ==
Dorothy Chacko was honoured with the Smith College Medal by her alma mater, Smith College, in 1970 and she was inducted into the Hall of Fame of Delaware County, Pennsylvania in 1996. The Government of India awarded her the fourth highest Indian civilian honour of Padma Shri in 1972. The Girl Scouts of Eastern Pennsylvania awarded her the Take the Lead Honour and the Philadelphia Evening Bulletin, the YWCA, and the Pennsylvania Medical Society also honoured her on different occasions.

== See also ==
- Chester Rural Cemetery
- Smith College
- Columbia University College of Physicians and Surgeons
- Metropolitan Hospital Center
