= Henry Graham Ashmead =

American historian and journalist (1838–1920)

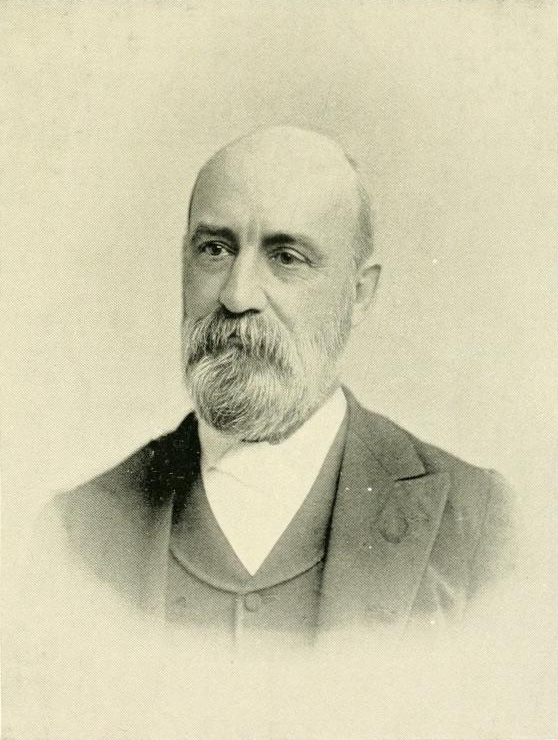
- Ashmead in 1894
- Born: June 30, 1838; Philadelphia, U.S.
- Died: November 27, 1920 (aged 82); Chester, Pennsylvania, U.S.
- Burial place: Chester Rural Cemetery
- Occupations: historian, journalist

Henry Graham Ashmead (June 30, 1838 – November 27, 1920) was an American historian, journalist, and chronicler of Delaware County, Pennsylvania. His History of Delaware County, Pennsylvania (1884) is one of the classic texts of southeastern Pennsylvania history.

== Life and career ==
Ashmead was born in Philadelphia on June 30, 1838. His parents were John Wayne Ashmead, a successful lawyer who served as the United States Attorney for the Eastern District of Pennsylvania, and Henrietta Graham Flower. His maternal great-grandfather and namesake, Henry Hale Graham, was the first presiding judge of the Delaware County Courts of Common Pleas. Both his parents were of English descent. Ashmead attended West Chester Academy in West Chester, Pennsylvania, and Saunders' Institute in West Philadelphia. As a boy, he met Edgar Allan Poe, and as a young man, he was a friend of Frank R. Stockton, who named a character in his Christmas story "Major Pendallas" after Ashmead.

Ashmead read law in his father's New York office and gained admittance to the New York bar on November 29, 1859. He practiced law briefly alongside classmate Leon Abbett, a future governor of New Jersey, but abandoned his legal career because of ill health, on the advice of his physicians. He later "embarked in outdoor uncongenial occupations in which he was unsuccessful". After his father died in 1868, he accompanied his mother to her hometown of Chester, Pennsylvania, where he embarked on a career in journalism and public history. He worked as a reporter and editor for the Chester Daily News and later the Delaware County Republican. In 1882, he became secretary of the Pennsylvania Bi-Centennial Association of Chester. In 1885, President Grover Cleveland appointed him to the office of postmaster of Chester.

== Family and death ==
Ashmead married Rebecca Frances Warner in 1872. Their son, John Wayne Ashmead, died at age 18. After his first wife's death, he married Emma Campbell in 1881. He died in Chester on November 27, 1920, at the age of 82, and is interred at Chester Rural Cemetery.

== Publications ==
Ashmead authored several books and articles on the history of Delaware County. The Pennsylvania Magazine of History and Biography predicted that his Historical Sketch of Chester "will prove of great value to the genealogist and antiquarian". He also wrote several minor stage plays.

- Gilbert, Cope; Ashmead, Henry Graham, eds. (1904). Historic Homes and Institutions and Genealogical and Personal Memoirs of Chester and Delaware Counties, Pennsylvania. Vol. 2. New York: Lewis Publishing Company.
- Ashmead, Henry Graham (1884). History of Delaware County, Pennsylvania. Philadelphia: L. H. Everts.
- Ashmead, Henry Graham; Johnson, William Shaler (1883). Historical Sketch of Chester, on Delaware. Chester, PA: Republican Steam Printing House.
