= David Trainer (textile manufacturer) =

American textile manufacturer and banker (1814–1890)

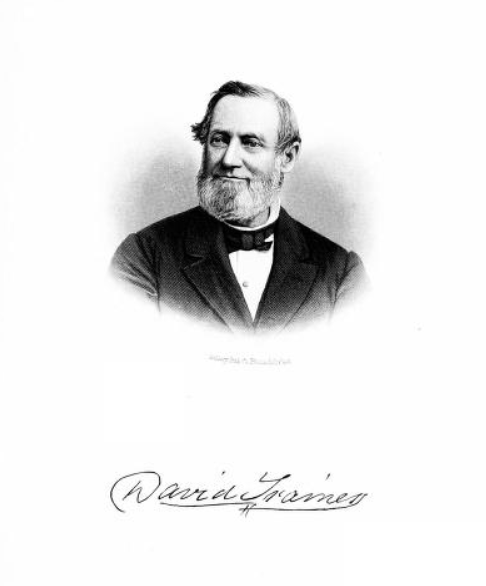
- Born: July 9, 1814
- Died: April 7, 1890 (aged 75)
- Resting place: Chester Rural Cemetery, Chester, Pennsylvania, U.S.
- Occupations: Textile manufacturer, banker

David Trainer (July 9, 1814 - April 7, 1890) was an American textile manufacturer and banker from Chester, Pennsylvania.

== Early life ==
David Trainer was born to David and Mary (Newlin) Trainer on July 9, 1814.

== Career ==
In 1837, Trainer, in association with John Haistings Jr., changed the Old Price Grist Mill, which was owned by Trainer's father into a cotton factory.

In 1842, the partnership between Trainer and John Haistings Jr. was dissolved and Trainer took over full ownership of the company.

Trainer owned the "Linwood Mills", one of the largest textile factories in the region. In 1851, the Trainer Mill was destroyed by fire, but by 1852 it was replaced by a new 3 1/2-story mill. Mill #2 was built in 1869 and Mill #3 in 1873.

Trainer was a director of the Delaware County National Bank and served as the third president from 1874 to 1875. Trainer was re-elected president but declined the position.

== Personal life ==
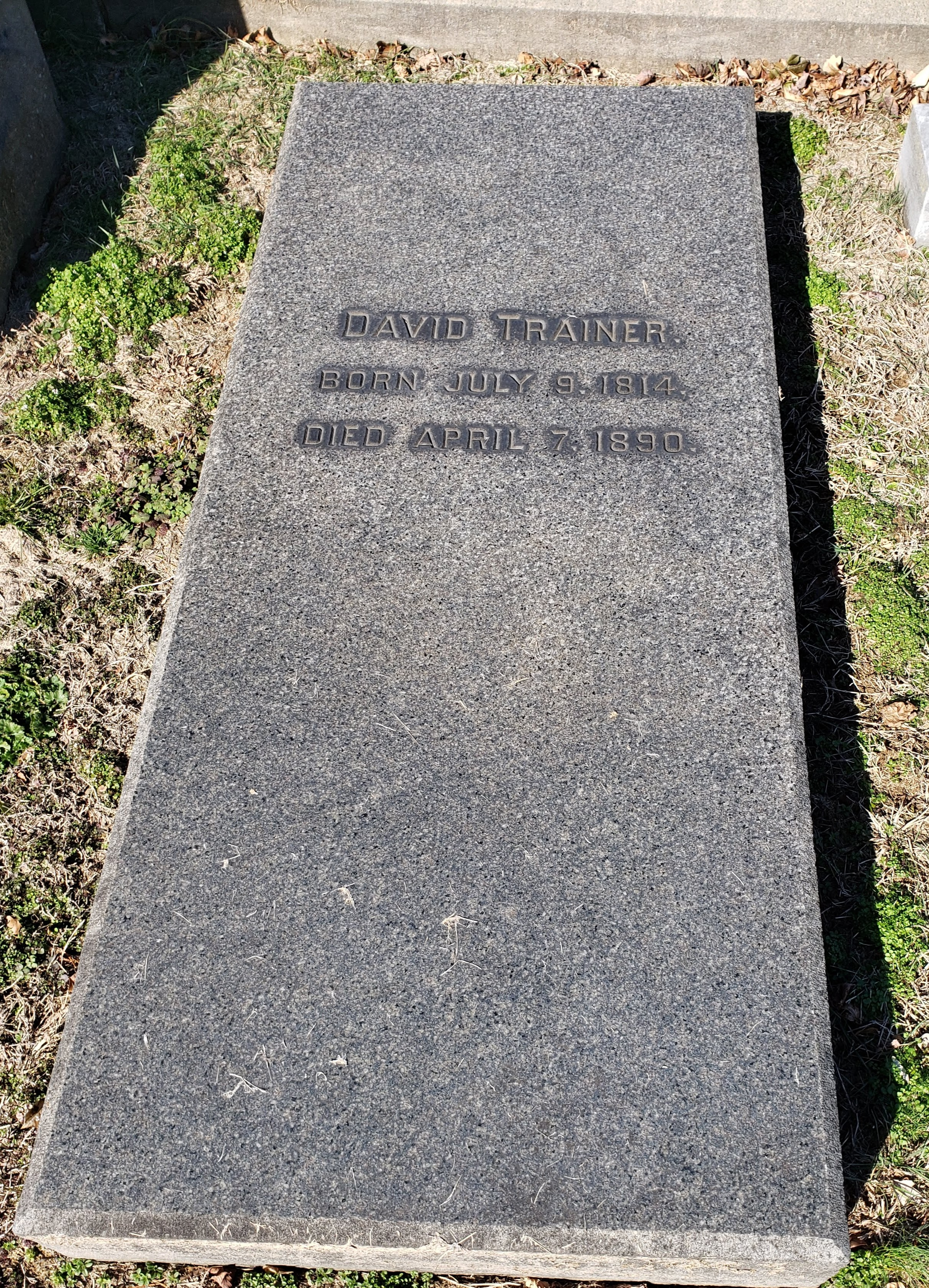
David Trainer gravestone in Chester Rural Cemetery

Trainer was twice married. His first wife was Ellen Eyre and together they had seven children. Mrs. Trainer died in March, 1872.

Trainer was a churchwarden of the St. Martin's Church in Marcus Hook, Pennsylvania.

Trainer is interred at the Chester Rural Cemetery.

== Legacy ==
The borough of Trainer, Pennsylvania is named after Trainer.
