= John Larkin Jr. =

American businessman and first mayor of Chester, Pennsylvania

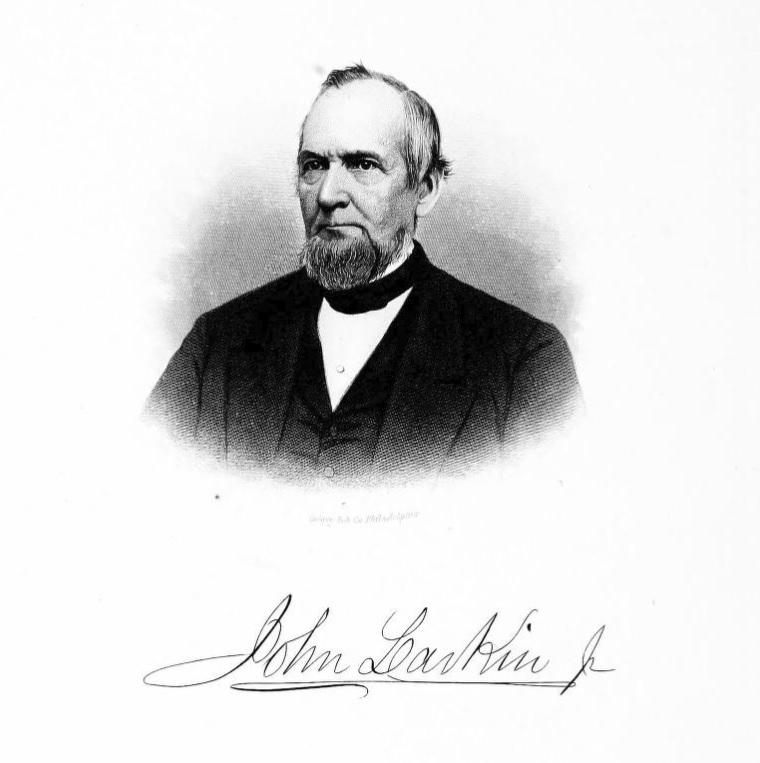
- Born: October 3, 1804; Concord Township, Pennsylvania, U.S.
- Died: July 22, 1896 (aged 91)
- Resting place: Chester Rural Cemetery, Chester, Pennsylvania, U.S.
- Occupation(s): Shipping, banking, real estate, first mayor of Chester, Pennsylvania

John Larkin Jr. (October 3, 1804 - July 22, 1896) was an American businessman, banker and politician from Pennsylvania who served as the first mayor of Chester, Pennsylvania.

== Early life ==
Larkin was born in Concord Township to John and Martha Larkin. As a young adult he worked on the family farm in the summer and taught school in the winter.

== Career ==
In 1826, Larkin began his business career by establishing a country store in Upper Chichester Township.

In 1832, Larkin purchased a freight vessel and established a shipping line on the Delaware River between Marcus Hook and Philadelphia until 1839 when he sold the vessel, wharf and business interest.

In 1840, Larkin was elected Sheriff of Delaware County.

From 1844 to 1846, Larkin represented Delaware County in the Pennsylvania House of Representatives.

In 1848, Larkin built two vessels and established a daily shipping line delivering goods between Chester and Philadelphia.

In 1849, Larkin formed a partnership with William Booth which they named Larkin & Booth. The partners established the daily shipment of coal and lumber between Chester and Philadelphia. The firm was prosperous but was dissolved in 1852.

In 1850, Larkin entered the real estate business and over the following twenty years was instrumental in developing multiple sections of Chester and nearby Marcus Hook for housing and business. He purchased an eighty-three acre lot from John Cochran just north of the old borough of Chester and laid out streets and building lots. Larkin built over 500 buildings including mills, stores and dwellings in this section of Chester which became known as "Larkintown".

In 1857, Larkin was elected Chief Burgess of Chester and became the president of the Chester Gas Company.

In 1866, Larkin was elected the first mayor of Chester. He was re-elected in 1869. He refused to accept any salary for his service as mayor.

Larkin was one of the founders and president of the Chester Mutual Insurance Company.

In 1871, Larkin became the president of the First National Bank in Chester.

== Philanthropy ==
In 1879, Larkin donated two acres of land adjacent to the St. Martin's Church in Marcus Hook, Pennsylvania for use as a cemetery.

Larkin was one of the originators of the Chester Rural Cemetery in Chester, Pennsylvania and served as president of the organization for many years.

== Personal life ==
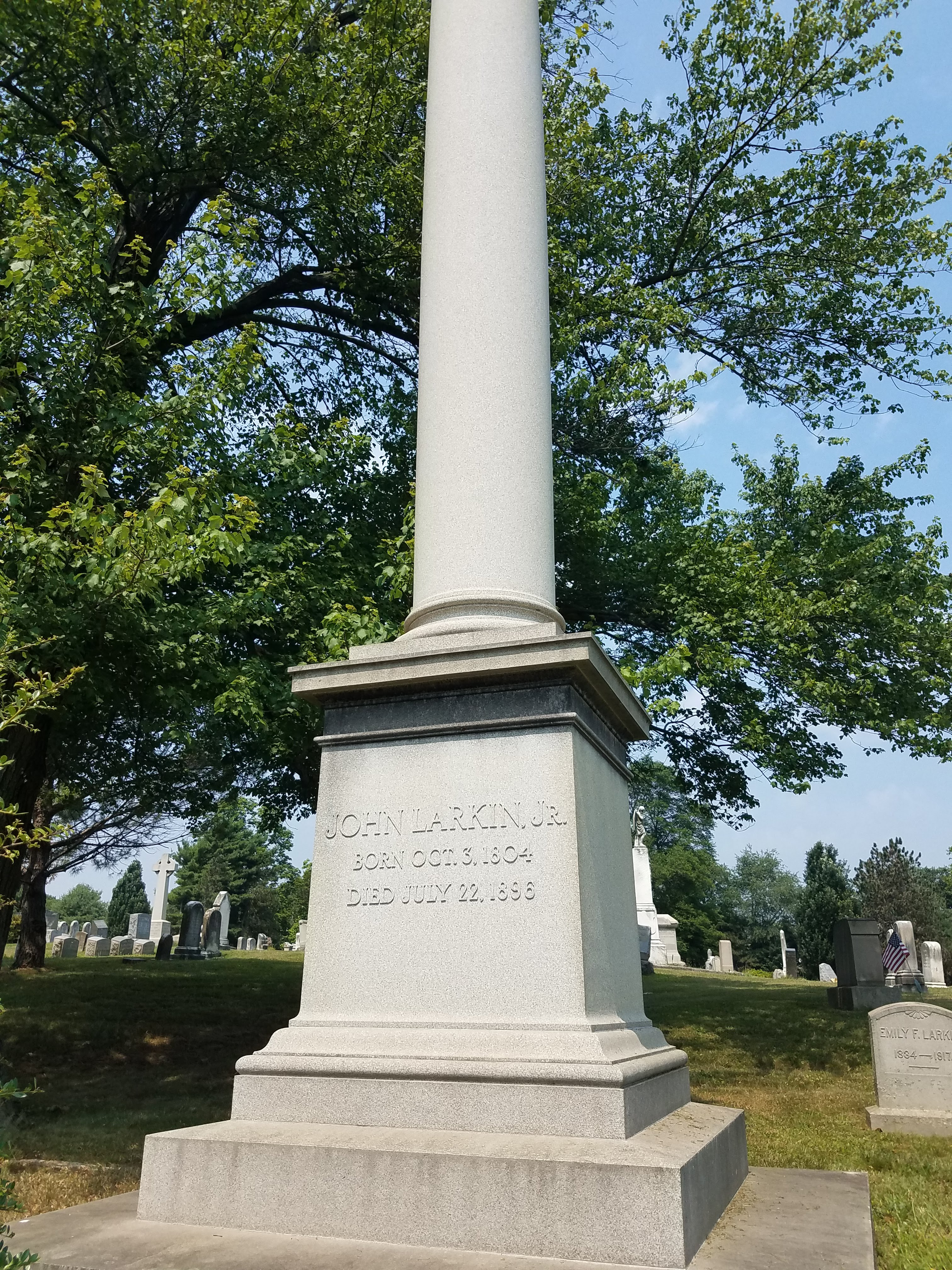
Larkin's grave in Chester Rural Cemetery in Chester, Pennsylvania

In 1827, Larkin married Charlotte Morton. Together they had eight children including a daughter Caroline who married U.S. Representative John Martin Broomall. Charlotte died in 1847 and Larkin was married again to Mary Baggs. Together they had two children. Larkin is interred at Chester Rural Cemetery.

== Legacy ==
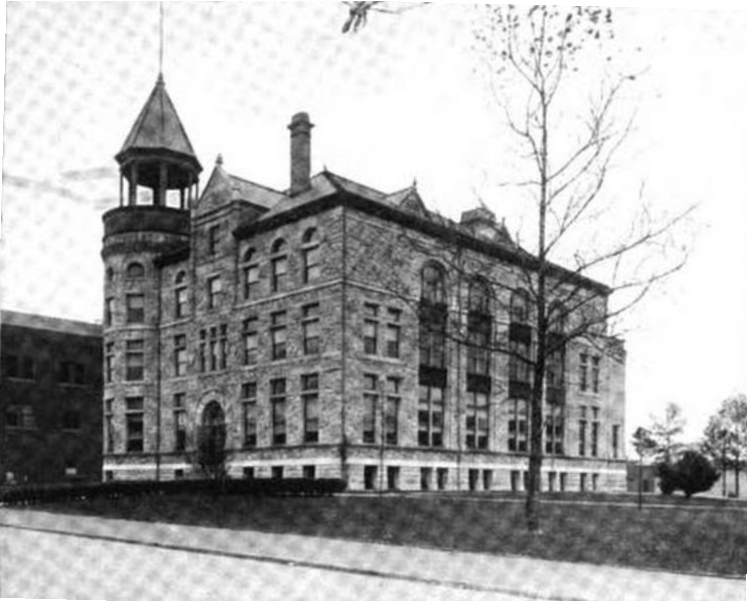
Larkin Grammar School, Chester, Pennsylvania

The Larkin School in Chester, erected in 1894, was named in his honor.

== See also ==
- List of mayors of Chester, Pennsylvania
