= Chester Rural Cemetery =

Historic cemetery in Chester, Pennsylvania

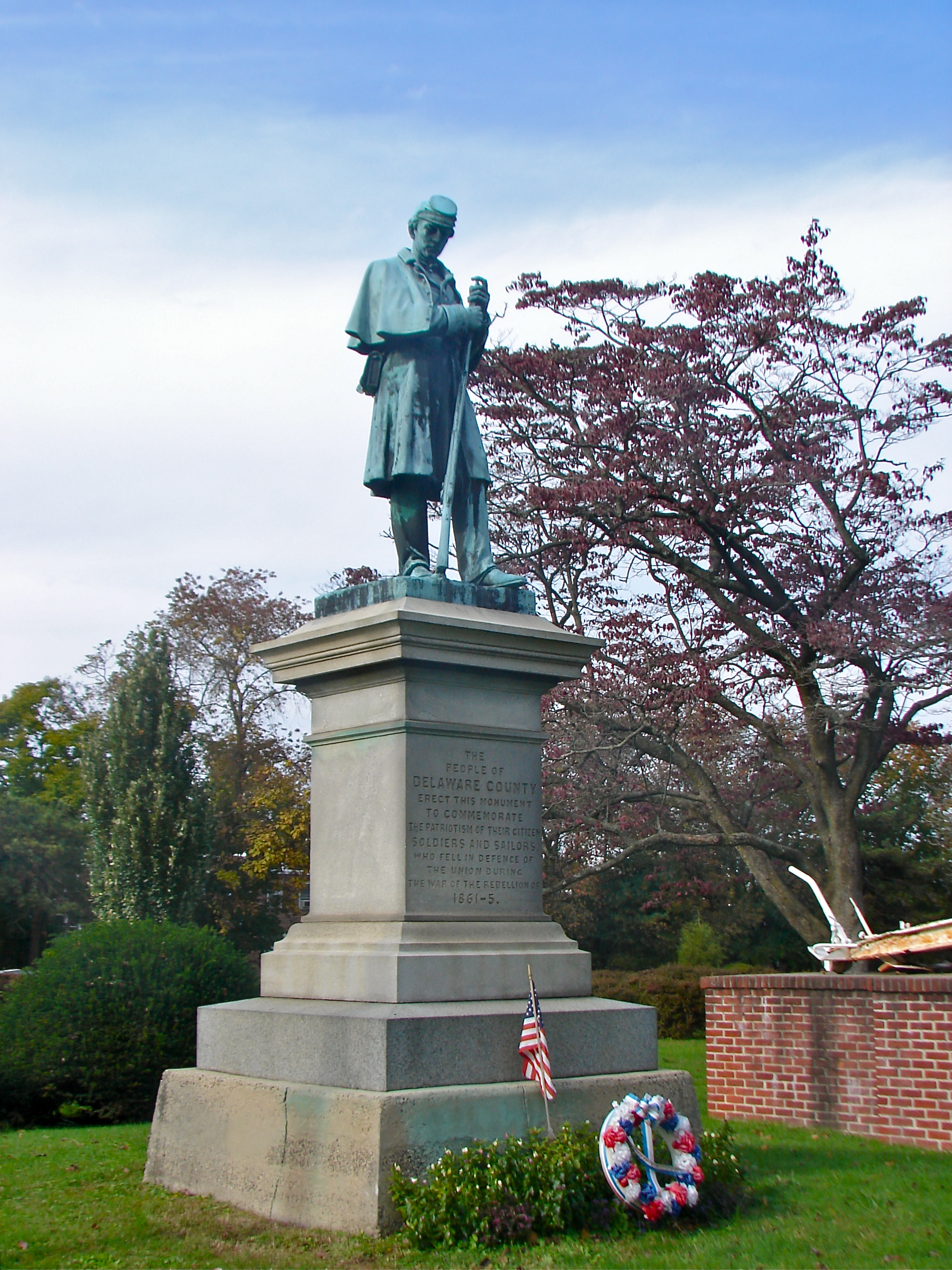
- Civil War Memorial by Martin Milmore
- Interactive map of Chester Rural Cemetery

Details
- Established: 1863
- Location: Chester, Pennsylvania
- Country: United States
- Coordinates: 39°51′37″N 75°22′5″W
- Type: Public
- Size: 36 acres (15 ha)
- No. of graves: 31,000
- Find a Grave: 45940

Chester Rural Cemetery is a historic rural cemetery founded in March 1863 in Chester, Pennsylvania. Some of the first burials were Civil War soldiers, both Union and Confederate, who died at the government hospital located at the nearby building which became the Crozer Theological Seminary.

== Description ==
The cemetery is landscaped and had a large lake that was drained in the 1950s. It covers 36 acres and contains approximately 31,000 graves. Two monuments in the cemetery have been documented by the Smithsonian Institution Research Information System: the statue "Sorrow" by Samuel Murray atop the Alfred O. Deshong memorial, and the Civil War Memorial, by Martin Milmore.

=== Soldiers Circle ===
Veterans from the Civil War and other conflicts are buried in this area of the cemetery. There are also memorials to commemorate each war since the Civil War.

On September 17, 1873, the Soldier's Monument was dedicated to the memory of the soldiers and sailors of Delaware County who died in the Civil War. The dedication was attended by 8,000 people. The main speaker at the dedication was the U.S. Congressman John Weiss Forney and many dignitaries attended, including Major General Galusha Pennypacker.

On the front of the Civil War Memorial is the following inscription:

The people of Delaware County erected this monument to commemorate the patriotism of their citizens, soldiers and sailors who fell in defense of the Union in the War of the Rebellion 1861–1865

== History ==
Chester Rural Cemetery was a part of the United States National Cemetery System during the Civil War with a leased lot within the cemetery for soldiers that died in the nearby hospital. Many of the soldiers' graves, including Confederate soldiers, were moved to Philadelphia National Cemetery in Philadelphia in 1892.

On April 13, 1917, 55 unidentified victims of the Eddystone explosion at the Eddystone Ammunition Corporation were buried in a mass grave at the Chester Rural Cemetery. An estimated 12,000 people attended the funeral service.

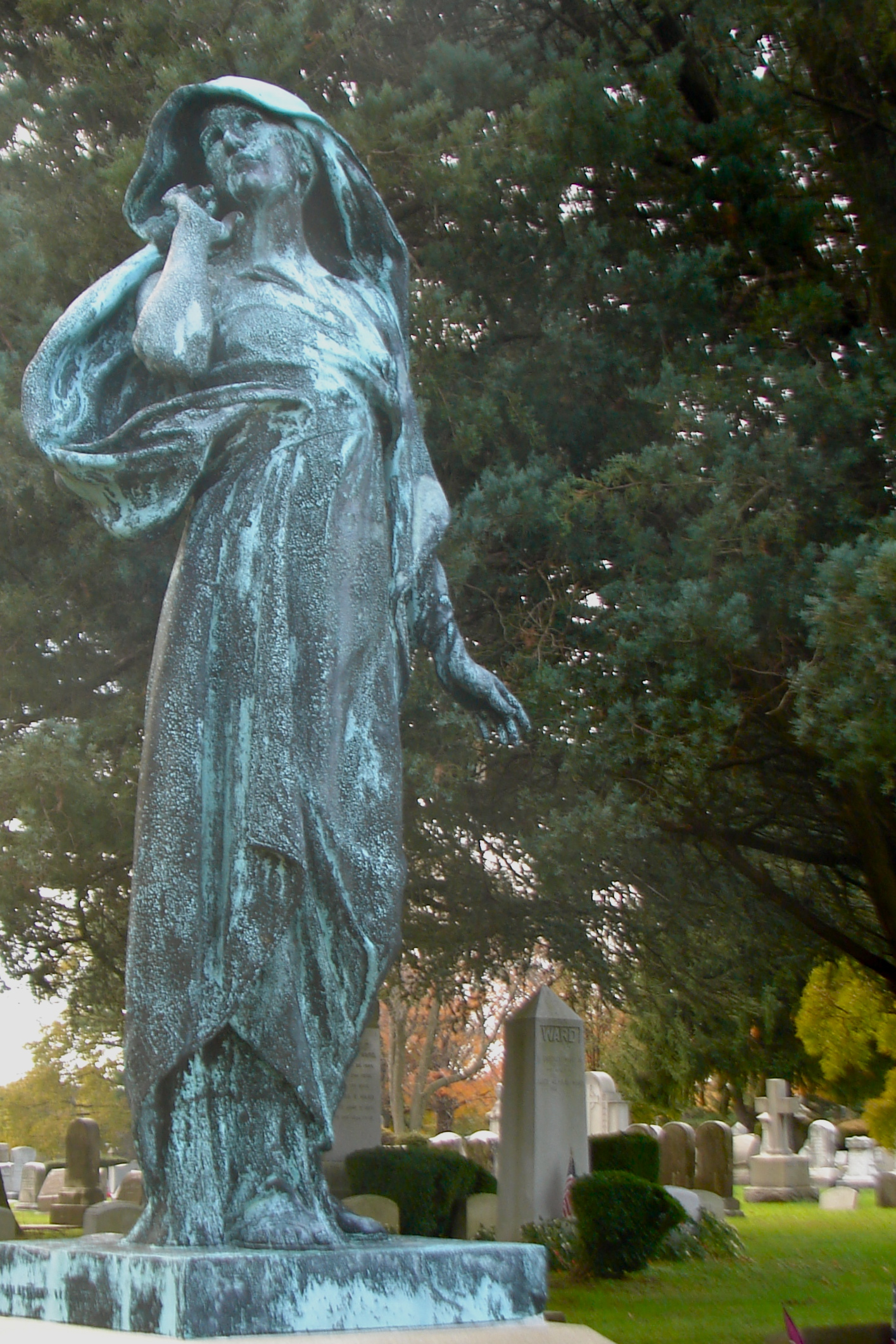
"Sorrow" (1912), atop the Alfred O. Deshong grave, by Samuel Murray

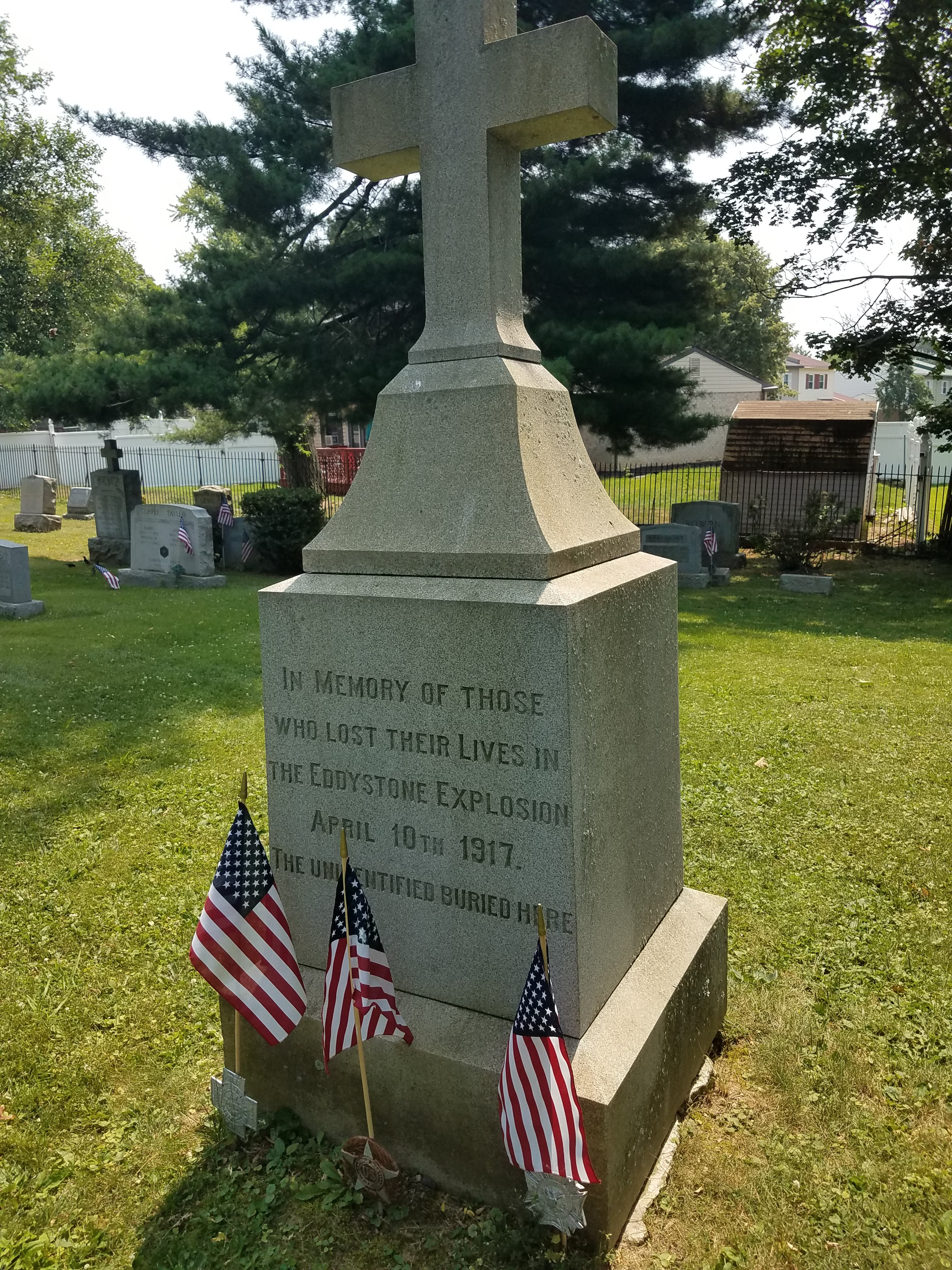
The Eddystone explosion memorial marks the location of the mass grave of 55 unidentified victims

== Notable burials ==
- Henry Graham Ashmead (1838–1920), journalist and historian of Delaware County, Pennsylvania
- Edward Fitzgerald Beale (1822–1893), Explorer of the West, a founder of California, hero of the US-Mexican War, US diplomat
- Clarence D. Bell (1914–2002), Pennsylvania state senator
- William H. Berry (1852–1928), Pennsylvania State Treasurer and 10th mayor of Chester
- Dorothy Chacko (1904–1992), US physician and Padma Shri awardee
- Robert Chadwick (1834–1902), Pennsylvania state representative
- Joseph R. T. Coates (died 1921), Civil War Major, Mayor of Chester
- Walter H. Craig (1880–1937), Pennsylvania state representative for Delaware County from 1923 to 1925
- Edward Darlington (1795–1884), US congressman
- Alfred O. Deshong (1837–1913), industrialist, philanthropist and art collector
- John O. Deshong (1807–1881), businessman and banker
- Peter Deshong (1781–1827), businessman and banker
- Samuel Edwards (1785–1850), US congressman
- David Reese Esrey (1825–1898), businessman and banker
- John K. Hagerty (1867–1945), Pennsylvania state representative
- John B. Hinkson (1840–1901), lawyer, businessman and sixth mayor of Chester
- Mignonette Kokin, aka Margaret Galetti (1880–1957), vaudeville dancer, singer and actress
- John Larkin, Jr. (1804–1896), businessman, banker and first mayor of Chester
- John J. McClure (1886–1965), Pennsylvania state senator
- Edward Nothnagle (1866–1938), Pennsylvania state representative for Delaware County (1926–1936)
- William G. Price, Jr. (1869–1960), businessman and Pennsylvania National Guard officer
- James William Reese (1920–1943), Medal of Honor recipient
- William Cameron Sproul (1870–1928), Pennsylvania governor
- John R. Sweney (1837–1899), gospel music composer
- David Trainer (1814–1890), textile manufacturer and banker
- Henry Clay Vedder (1853–1935), Baptist church historian
- Young Singleton Walter (1811–1888), Pennsylvania state representative for Delaware County from 1877 to 1880, owner of Delaware County Republican newspaper
- William Ward (1837–1895), US congressman
- William Ward Jr. (1865–1949), Pennsylvania representative and two-term mayor of Chester
- Jonathan Edwards Woodbridge (1844–1935), American shipbuilder
- William P. Worrall (1827–1887), Pennsylvania state representative for Delaware County from 1875 to 1876
