= Samuel M. Vauclain =

American engineer (1856–1940)

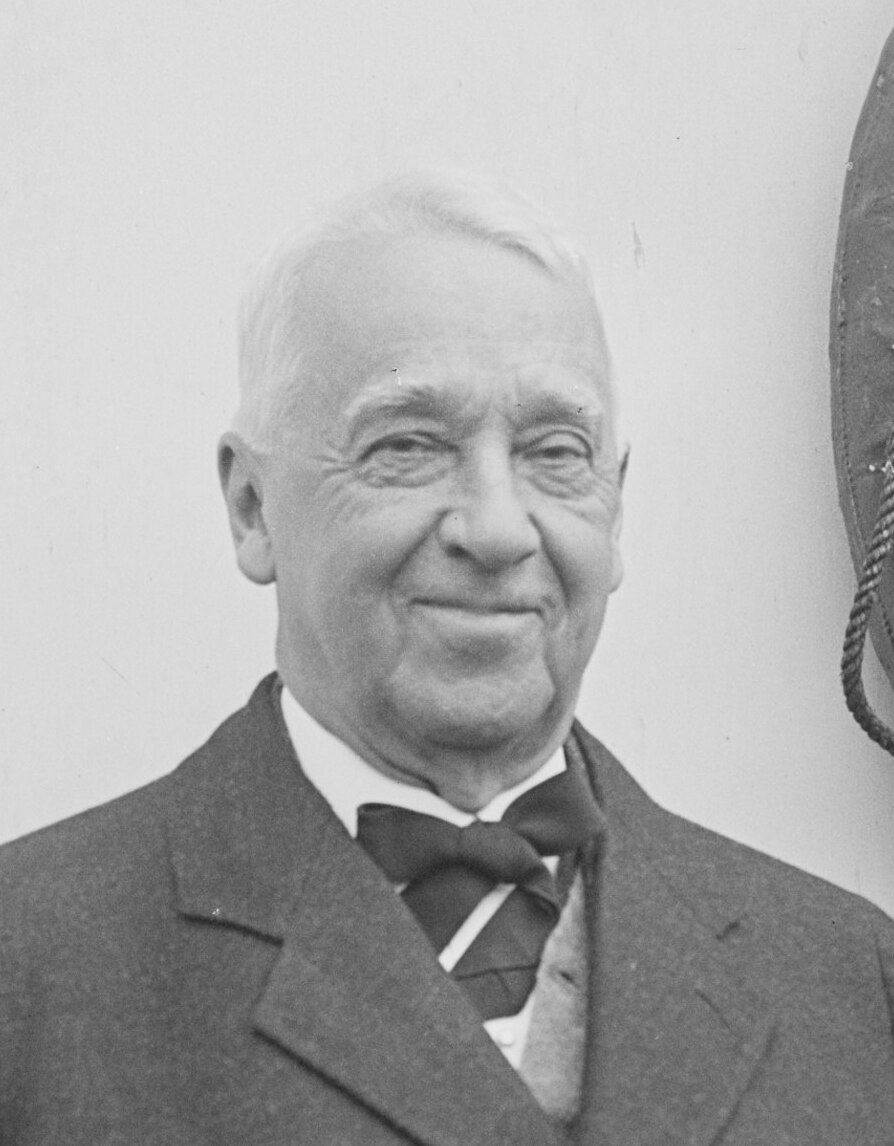
- Vauclain in 1926
- Born: May 18, 1856; Philadelphia, Pennsylvania, U.S.
- Died: February 4, 1940 (aged 83); Rosemont, Pennsylvania, U.S.
- Resting place: Church of the Redeemer Cemetery; Bryn Mawr, Pennsylvania, U.S.
- Occupation: Engineer
- Political party: Republican Party
- Spouse: Annie Kearney (m. 1879–1923)
- Children: 6

Samuel Matthews Vauclain (May 18, 1856 – February 4, 1940) was an American engineer, inventor of the Vauclain compound locomotive, and president of the Baldwin Locomotive Works.

== Railroads ==
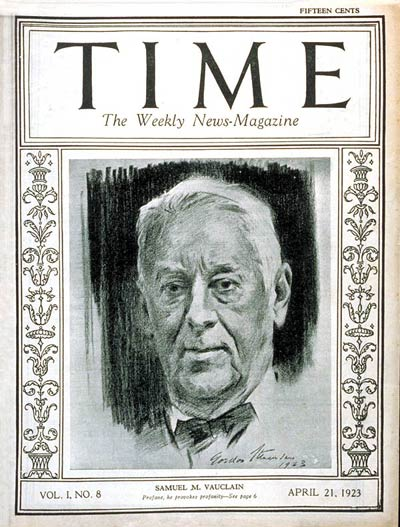
Vauclain on the cover of the April 21, 1923 issue of TIME Magazine

Vauclain served an apprenticeship in the machine shops of the Pennsylvania Railroad. When he was 24, he was sent to inspect locomotives at the Baldwin Locomotive Works. In those days, machining was a manual job with the machining done by hammers, files and chisels with the men's own hands. Vauclain's hands were left in a permanent clutching position from endless hours of chipping and filing metal. He became general foreman of Baldwin's 17th Street Shops in 1883, and quickly moved up through the company, as plant superintendent in 1886, then general superintendent. He joined the board of directors in 1896, became vice-president in 1911, senior vice-president in 1917, president from 1919 to 1929, and chairman of the board from then until his death.

During World War I, Vauclain helped organize the Munitions Standards Board. He then served as chairman of the special advisory subcommittee on plants and munitions for the War Industries Board. He helped supply locomotives to the allied armies overseas and supervised the manufacture of heavy ordnance for the war effort.

He met with professor Thomas Garrigue Masaryk in 1918 to support the Czechoslovak Legion.

== Honors ==
He was awarded the Elliott Cresson Medal by The Franklin Institute in 1891. At the same time, the Franklin Institute selected Vauclain for the John Scott Award funded by the City of Philadelphia. He was elected to the American Philosophical Society in 1899.

In 1919, he was awarded the Distinguished Service Medal by the War Department for arming the United States Army during World War I.

Vauclain was elected an honorary member of the American Society of Mechanical Engineers in 1920.

== Personal life ==
Samuel Vauclain was born in Port Richmond, Philadelphia, Pennsylvania, the son of Andrew Constant Vauclain and Mary Ann Campbell Vauclain. In 1879, he married Annie Kearney; they had six children. Kearney would die on July 4, 1923.

Vauclain was a Republican, and served as a delegate from Pennsylvania's 7th District to the 1920 Republican National Convention, which nominated Warren G. Harding for president.

In 1923, he and several Baldwin officials took a trip around the Middle West in which he gave eight speeches in eight cities.

Vauclain died following a heart attack, in Broadlawn, his home at Rosemont, Pennsylvania. He was buried at Church of the Redeemer Cemetery in Bryn Mawr.

== See also ==
- Baldwin Locomotive Works
- Vauclain compound
- Compound locomotive

Awards and achievements
Preceded by Winston Churchill	Cover of Time Magazine; 21 April 1923	Succeeded by Fuad I of Egypt
