= Worrilow =

Worrilow is a surname. Notable people with the surname include:

- Paul Worrilow (born 1990), American football player
- Thomas Worrilow (1918–2004), American politician
