= 2015 Atlanta Falcons season =

NFL team season

- Owner: Arthur Blank
- General manager: Thomas Dimitroff
- Head coach: Dan Quinn
- Home stadium: Georgia Dome

Results
- Record: 8–8
- Division place: 2nd NFC South
- Playoffs: Did not qualify
- Pro Bowlers: RB Devonta Freeman; WR Julio Jones; CB Desmond Trufant; FB Patrick DiMarco

The 2015 season was the Atlanta Falcons' 50th in the National Football League (NFL) and their first under new head coach Dan Quinn.

The Falcons started the season 5–0, their best start since 2012. However, they struggled throughout the rest of the season, losing eight of their remaining eleven games to finish at .500 for the first time since 2005. After their Week 15 win at EverBank Field against the Jacksonville Jaguars, the Falcons managed to improve their record from the previous season. The highlight of the season was the team's Week 16 victory over their divisional rival Carolina Panthers who were 14–0 coming into the game. The Falcons thus denied the Panthers a perfect regular season, which would have made them the second team since the NFL expanded to a 16-game schedule to achieve that feat. (Note: The 2007 Patriots were the first; however, the Patriots lost to the New York Giants in Super Bowl XLII. When the NFL regular season was only 14 games long, the 1972 Miami Dolphins achieved a complete perfect season finishing 17—0, while when it was still shorter, the Chicago Bears achieved perfect regular seasons in both 1934 and 1942, but lost the NFL Championship game on both occasions.)

The Falcons' 2015 coaching staff produced three future head coaches: quarterbacks coach Matt LaFleur, offensive assistant Mike McDaniel, and offensive coordinator Kyle Shanahan.

== Offseason ==
=== Coaching staff changes ===
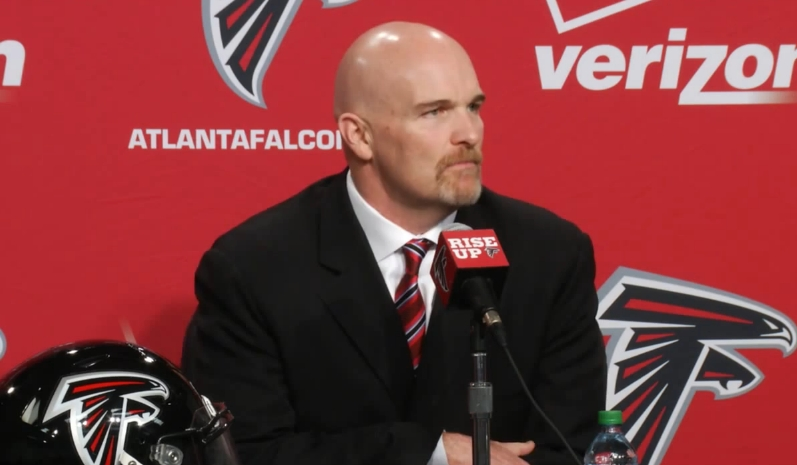
Dan Quinn at his introductory press conference

- On December 29, 2014 head coach Mike Smith was fired after back-to-back losing seasons.
- The Tampa Bay Buccaneers announced the hiring of Dirk Koetter as their new offensive coordinator.
- On January 15, 2015, the New York Jets announced the hiring of Joe Danna as their new defensive backs coach.
- On January 16, 2015, the Oakland Raiders announced the hiring of Mike Tice as their new offensive line coach.
- On January 18, 2015, the Falcons announced the hiring of Kyle Shanahan as their new offensive coordinator.
- On January 23, 2015, the Chicago Bears announced the hiring of Glenn Pires as their new linebackers coach.
- On January 24, 2015, the Falcons announced the hiring of Raheem Morris as their defensive backs coach and assistant head coach.
- On January 26, 2015, the Falcons announced the hiring of Richard Smith as their defensive coordinator.
- On January 25, 2015, the Falcons promoted Wade Harman Tight Ends Coach, formally the assistant offensive line coach.
- On January 29, 2015, the San Diego Chargers announced the hiring of Mike Nolan as their linebackers coach.
- On January 31, 2015, the San Francisco 49ers announced the hiring of Tim Lewis as their defensive backs coach.
- On February 2, 2015, Dan Quinn was hired as the Falcons' 16th head coach.
- On February 2, 2015, the Falcons announced the hiring of Chris Morgan as their offensive line coach.
- On February 3, 2015, the Falcons announced the hiring of Bobby Turner as their running backs coach.
- On February 3, 2015, the Falcons announced the hiring of Mike LaFleur as their offensive assistant.
- On February 3, 2015, the Falcons announced the hiring of Marquand Manuel as their defensive backs coach and senior defensive consultant.
- On February 4, 2015, the Tampa Bay Buccaneers announced the hiring of Andrew Weidinger as their offensive assistant.
- On February 4, 2015, the Falcons announced the hiring of Steve Scarnecchia as their assistant to head coach coach.
- On February 8, 2015, the Falcons announced the hiring of Jeff Ulbrich as their linebackers coach.
- On February 10, 2015, the Falcons announced the hiring of Matt LaFleur as their Quarterback coach.
- On February 10, 2015, the Falcons announced the hiring of Doug Mallory as their defensive Assistant & Linebackers coach.
- On February 10, 2015, the Falcons announced the hiring of Mike McDaniel as their offensive assistant.
- On February 10, 2015, the Falcons announced the hiring of Chad Walker as their defensive assistant & defensive backs coach.
- On February 10, 2015, the Falcons announced the hiring of Keith Carter as their assistant offensive line coach.

=== Free agents ===
Number	Player	Position
28	Javier Arenas	Cornerback
71	Kroy Biermann	Defensive end
3	Matt Bryant	Kicker
68	Gabe Carimi	Offensive tackle
19	Drew Davis	Wide receiver
42	Patrick DiMarco	Fullback
30	Charles Godfrey	Free safety
79	Mike Johnson	Offensive guard
20	Dwight Lowery	Free safety
98	Cliff Matthews	Defensive end
27	Robert McClain	Cornerback
86	Bear Pascoe	Tight end
91	Corey Peters	Defensive tackle
32	Jacquizz Rodgers	Running back
64	Jonathan Scott	Offensive tackle
35	Antone Smith	Running back
52	Nate Stupar	Linebacker
50	Osi Umenyiora	Defensive end
56	Sean Weatherspoon	Linebacker
14	Eric Weems	Wide receiver
26	Josh Wilson	Cornerback
13	T. J. Yates	Quarterback

=== Re-signings ===
Date	Player	Position	Contract	Source
February 24, 2015	Cliff Matthews	Defensive end	2 years / $1,505,000	
February 24, 2015	Patrick DiMarco	Fullback	2 years / $1,495,000	
February 25, 2015	Matt Bryant	Kicker	3 years / $8,500,000	
March 3, 2015	Nate Stupar	Linebacker	1 years / $585,000	
March 5, 2015	Charles Godfrey	Safety	1 years / $1,500,000	
March 6, 2015	Eric Weems	Wide receiver	2 years / $3,000,000	
March 9, 2015	T. J. Yates	Quarterback	1 years / $1,500,000	
March 10, 2015	Antone Smith	Running back	1 years / $1,400,000	
March 18, 2015	Kroy Biermann	Linebacker	1 years / $1,925,000	

=== Team additions ===
Date	Player	Position	Previous team	Contract	Source
February 13, 2015	Allen Bradford	Linebacker	Seattle Seahawks	1 year / $660,000	
February 24, 2015	Nick Williams	Wide receiver	Washington Redskins	2-year / $1,100,000	
March 10, 2015	Brooks Reed	Linebacker	Houston Texans	5-year / $22,000,000	
March 10, 2015	Justin Durant	Linebacker	Dallas Cowboys	3-year / $10,800,000	
March 10, 2015	Mike Person	Guard	St. Louis Rams	3-year / $3,350,000	
March 10, 2015	Leonard Hankerson	Wide receiver	Washington Redskins	1 year / $1,000,000	
March 12, 2015	Adrian Clayborn	Defensive end	Tampa Bay Buccaneers	1 year / $3,000,000	
March 12, 2015	Phillip Adams	Cornerback	New York Jets	1 year / $745,000	
March 12, 2015	O'Brien Schofield	Defensive end	Seattle Seahawks	1 year / $1,700,000	
March 18, 2015	Jared Smith	Offensive guard	Seattle Seahawks	1 year / $440,000	
March 19, 2015	Jacob Tamme	Tight end	Denver Broncos	2-year / $4,000,000	
March 19, 2015	Tony Moeaki	Tight end	Seattle Seahawks	1 year / $745,000	
May 4, 2015	Collin Mooney	Fullback	Tennessee Titans	2-year / $1,100,000	
May 14, 2015	Tyler Polumbus	Offensive tackle	Washington Redskins	Undisclosed	
May 14, 2015	Chris Chester	Offensive guard	Washington Redskins	1 year / $2,800,000	
July 29, 2015	DeMarcus Love	Offensive tackle	Denver Broncos	Unknown	
August 7, 2015	Michael Ford	Running back	Chicago Bears	Unknown	
August 16, 2015	Terrell Manning	Linebacker	New York Giants	Unknown	
August 16, 2015	Evan Royster	Running back	Washington Redskins	Unknown	
August 24, 2015	John Harris	Wide receiver	Philadelphia Eagles	Unknown	
August 26, 2015	Rex Grossman	Quarterback	Cleveland Browns	Unknown	

=== Departures ===
Date	Player	Position	Note	New Team	Source
February 26, 2015	Steven Jackson	Running back	Released	New England Patriots	
February 27, 2015	Harry Douglas	Wide receiver	Released	Tennessee Titans	
February 27, 2015	Justin Blalock	Offensive guard	Released	Retired	
February 27, 2015	Jonathan Massaquoi	Defensive end	Waived	Tennessee Titans	
March 10, 2015	Sean Weatherspoon	Linebacker	Signed	Arizona Cardinals	
March 10, 2015	Corey Peters	Defensive end	Signed	Arizona Cardinals	
March 10, 2015	Drew Davis	Wide receiver	Declined option		
March 18, 2015	Robert McClain	Cornerback	Signed	New England Patriots	
March 31, 2015	Jacquizz Rodgers	Running back	Signed	Chicago Bears	
April 2, 2015	Zeke Motta	Safety	Waived		
April 3, 2015	Dwight Lowery	Safety	Signed	Indianapolis Colts	
April 3, 2015	Josh Wilson	Cornerback	Signed	Detroit Lions	
April 23, 2015	Bear Pascoe	Tight end	Signed	Chicago Bears	
May 1, 2015	Brandan Bishop	Safety	Waived		
May 1, 2015	Reid Fragel	Tackle	Waived	Tampa Bay Buccaneers	
May 1, 2015	Jordan Mabin	Cornerback	Waived	San Diego Chargers	
May 1, 2015	Jacques Smith	Linebacker	Waived		
May 1, 2015	Ronnie Wingo	Running back	Waived		
May 3, 2015	Kyle Miller	Tight end	Waived	San Diego Chargers	
May 29, 2015	Prince Shembo	Linebacker	Waived		
June 15, 2015	Sam Baker	Offensive tackle	Released		
August 1, 2015	Harland Gunn	Offensive guard	Released	New England Patriots	
August 10, 2015	Freddie Martino	Wide receiver	Waived	Philadelphia Eagles	
August 11, 2015	Javier Arenas	Cornerback	Signed	New York Jets	
August 12, 2015	Ricky Havili-Heimuli	Defensive tackle	Waived		
August 16, 2015	DeMarcus Love	Offensive tackle	Released		
August 24, 2015	Marquis Spruill	Linebacker	Waived		

== 2015 draft class ==
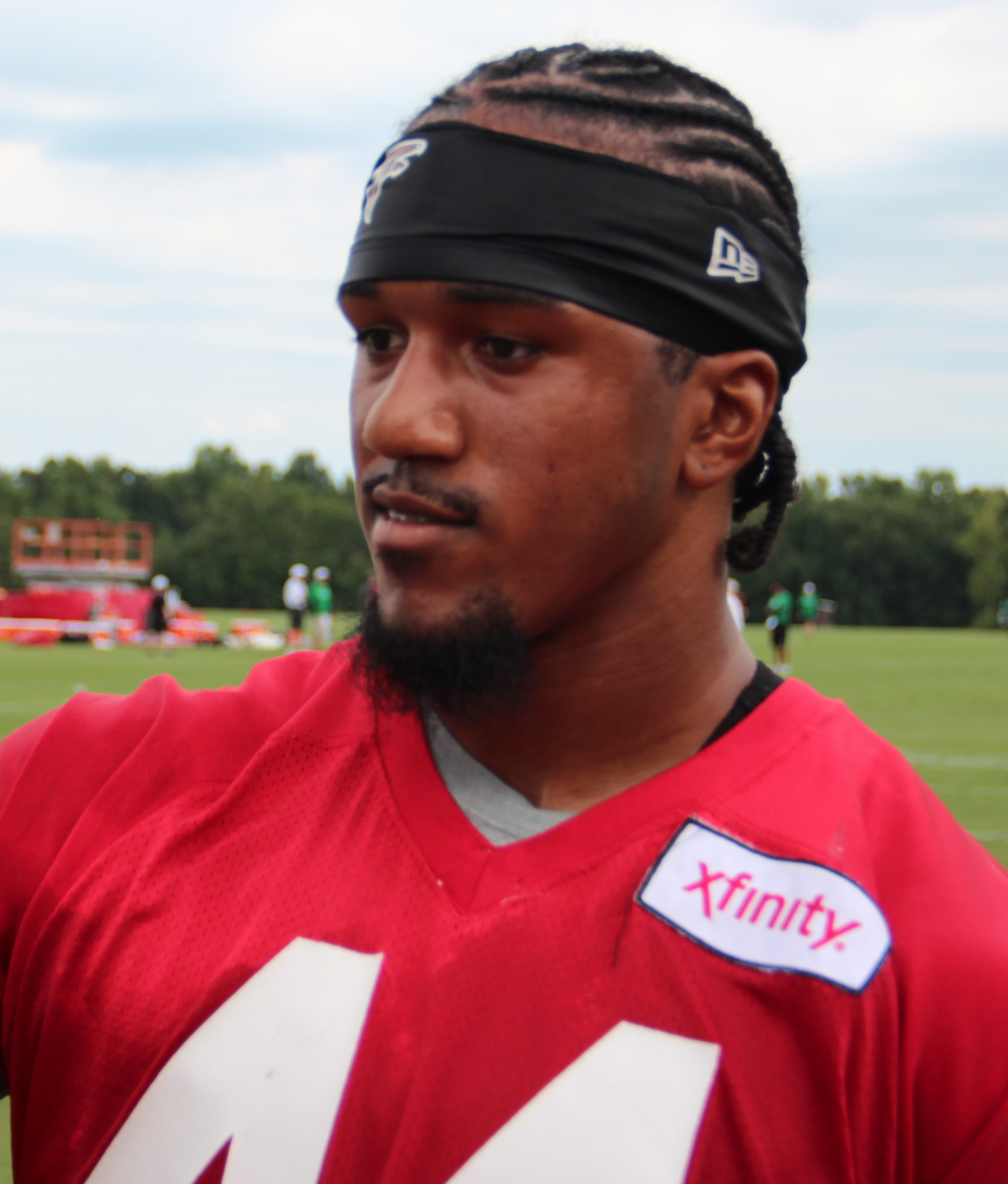
Vic Beasley, the Falcons' first-round pick

2015 Atlanta Falcons Draft
Round	Selection	Player	Position	College
1	8	Vic Beasley	Linebacker	Clemson
2	42	Jalen Collins	Cornerback	LSU
3	73	Tevin Coleman	Running back	Indiana
4	107	Justin Hardy	Wide receiver	East Carolina
5	137	Grady Jarrett	Defensive tackle	Clemson
6	185	None – see below		
7	225	Jake Rodgers	Offensive tackle	Eastern Washington
7	249	Akeem King	Safety	San Jose State

Notes

- The Falcons acquired an additional seventh-round selection (No. 249 overall) as part of a trade that sent the team's 2013 first-, third- and sixth-round selections to the St. Louis Rams.
- The Falcons were not rewarded with any compensatory picks this year.
- The Falcons traded their fifth- (No. 146 overall) and sixth-round (No. 185 overall) picks to the Minnesota Vikings in exchange for the Vikings' fifth-round selection (No. 137 overall).

== Staff ==
2015 Atlanta Falcons staff
Front office: Owner/chairman – Arthur Blank; President/CEO – Rich McKay; general manager – Thomas Dimitroff; Assistant general manager – Scott Pioli; Director of player personnel – Lionel Vital; Director of football administration – Nick Polk; Director of pro scouting – DeJuan Polk; Director of college scouting – Steve Sabo; Consultant – Joe Banner; Head coaches: Head coach – Dan Quinn; Assistant head coach/pass game coordinator – Raheem Morris; Assistant to the head coach – Steve Scarnecchia; Offensive coaches: Offensive coordinator – Kyle Shanahan; Quarterbacks – Matt LaFleur; Running backs – Bobby Turner; Wide receivers – Terry Robiskie; Tight ends – Wade Harman; Offensive line – Chris Morgan; Assistant offensive line – Keith Carter; Offensive assistant – Mike LaFleur; Offensive assistant – Mike McDaniel; Offensive quality control – Rich Scangarello	Defensive coaches: Defensive coordinator – Richard Smith; Defensive line – Bryan Cox; Linebackers – Jeff Ulbrich; Senior defensive assistant/secondary – Marquand Manuel; Defensive assistant/linebackers – Doug Mallory; Defensive assistant/defensive backs – Chad Walker; Special teams coaches: Special teams coordinator – Keith Armstrong; Assistant special teams – Eric Sutulovich; Strength and conditioning: Head strength and conditioning – A.J. Neibel; Strength and conditioning assistant – Jonas Beauchemin

== Final roster ==
2015 Atlanta Falcons roster
Quarterbacks (QB): 12 Sean Renfree; 2 Matt Ryan; Running backs (RB): 26 Tevin Coleman; 42 Patrick DiMarco FB; 24 Devonta Freeman; 33 Terron Ward; Wide receivers (WR): 16 Justin Hardy; 17 Devin Hester; 11 Julio Jones; 14 Eric Weems; 84 Roddy White; 15 Nick Williams; Tight ends (TE): 81 Tony Moeaki; 86 D. J. Tialavea; 83 Jacob Tamme; 80 Levine Toilolo	Offensive linemen (OL): 65 Chris Chester G; 63 Ben Garland G; 66 Gino Gradkowski C; 72 Bryce Harris T; 67 Andy Levitre G; 75 Jake Long T; 70 Jake Matthews T; 68 Mike Person C; 73 Ryan Schraeder T; Defensive linemen (DL): 44 Vic Beasley DE; 95 Jonathan Babineaux DT; 71 Kroy Biermann DE; 99 Adrian Clayborn DE; 93 Malliciah Goodman DE; 77 Ra'Shede Hageman DT; 94 Tyson Jackson DE; 97 Grady Jarrett DT; 74 Joey Mbu DT	Linebackers (LB): 52 Justin Durant OLB; 56 Brooks Reed OLB; 50 O'Brien Schofield OLB; 41 Tyler Starr OLB; 54 Nate Stupar; 55 Paul Worrilow MLB; 51 Philip Wheeler OLB; Defensive backs (DB): 20 Phillip Adams CB; 23 Robert Alford CB; 37 Ricardo Allen FS; 32 Jalen Collins CB; 30 Charles Godfrey SS; 36 Kemal Ishmael SS; 28 Akeem King CB; 27 Robenson Therezie FS; 21 Desmond Trufant CB; Special teams (ST): 5 Matt Bosher P; 6 Shayne Graham K; 47 Josh Harris LS	Practice squad: 91 Xzavier Dickson OLB; 89 C. J. Goodwin WR; 90 Curtis Grant MLB; 19 R.J. Harris WR; 35 Gus Johnson RB; 18 Jordan Leslie WR; 90 Dontay Moch OLB; 22 Terrance Parks SS; 64 Collin Rahrig G; 8 Matt Simms QB; Reserve: 3 Matt Bryant K (IR); 25 William Moore SS (IR); -- Beau Gardner TE (IR); -- Travis Howard CB (IR); 39 Collin Mooney FB (IR); 67 Adam Replogle G (IR); 96 Paul Soliai DT (IR); 62 James Stone G (IR); Rookies in italics 53 active, 8 reserve, 10 practice squad

== Preseason ==
=== Schedule ===
Week	Date	Opponent	Result	Record	Venue	Recap
1	August 14	Tennessee Titans	W 31–24	1–0	Georgia Dome	Recap
2	August 21	at New York Jets	L 22–30	1–1	MetLife Stadium	Recap
3	August 29	at Miami Dolphins	L 9–13	1–2	Sun Life Stadium	Recap
4	September 3	Baltimore Ravens	W 20–19	2–2	Georgia Dome	Recap

== Regular season ==
=== Schedule ===
Week	Date	Opponent	Result	Record	Venue	Recap
1	September 14	Philadelphia Eagles	W 26–24	1–0	Georgia Dome	Recap
2	September 20	at New York Giants	W 24–20	2–0	MetLife Stadium	Recap
3	September 27	at Dallas Cowboys	W 39–28	3–0	AT&T Stadium	Recap
4	October 4	Houston Texans	W 48–21	4–0	Georgia Dome	Recap
5	October 11	Washington Redskins	W 25–19 (OT)	5–0	Georgia Dome	Recap
6	October 15	at New Orleans Saints	L 21–31	5–1	Mercedes-Benz Superdome	Recap
7	October 25	at Tennessee Titans	W 10–7	6–1	Nissan Stadium	Recap
8	November 1	Tampa Bay Buccaneers	L 20–23 (OT)	6–2	Georgia Dome	Recap
9	November 8	at San Francisco 49ers	L 16–17	6–3	Levi's Stadium	Recap
10	Bye					
11	November 22	Indianapolis Colts	L 21–24	6–4	Georgia Dome	Recap
12	November 29	Minnesota Vikings	L 10–20	6–5	Georgia Dome	Recap
13	December 6	at Tampa Bay Buccaneers	L 19–23	6–6	Raymond James Stadium	Recap
14	December 13	at Carolina Panthers	L 0–38	6–7	Bank of America Stadium	Recap
15	December 20	at Jacksonville Jaguars	W 23–17	7–7	EverBank Field	Recap
16	December 27	Carolina Panthers	W 20–13	8–7	Georgia Dome	Recap
17	January 3	New Orleans Saints	L 17–20	8–8	Georgia Dome	Recap

=== Game summaries ===
==== Week 1: vs. Philadelphia Eagles ====
Week One: Philadelphia Eagles at Atlanta Falcons – Game summary

Quarter	1	2	3	4	Total
Eagles	0	3	14	7	24
Falcons	3	17	0	6	26

at Georgia Dome, Atlanta, Georgia

- Date: September 14
- Game time: 7:10 p.m. EDT
- Game weather: Played indoors (dome stadium)
- Game attendance: 70,516
- Referee: Terry McAulay
- TV announcers (ESPN): Mike Tirico, Jon Gruden and Lisa Salters
- Recap, Gamebook

Game information

First quarter

- ATL – 10:55 Matt Bryant 41-yard FG.
  Drive: 7 plays, 52 yards, 3:04. (ATL 3–0)

Second quarter

- ATL – 10:44 Julio Jones 4-yard TD pass from Matt Ryan, Matt Bryant kick.
  Drive: 11 plays, 88, yards, 5:39. (ATL 10–0)
- PHI – 7:18 Cody Parkey 29-yard FG.
  Drive: 11 plays, 69 yards, 3:26. (ATL 10–3)
- ATL – 10:55 Matt Bryant 39-yard FG.
  Drive: 9 plays, 25 yards, 4:00. (ATL 13–3)
- ATL – 0:45 Julio Jones 22-yard TD pass from Matt Ryan, Matt Bryant kick.
  Drive: 1 play, 27, yards, 0:14. (ATL 20–3)

Third quarter

- PHI – 13:13 DeMarco Murray 8-yard TD run, Cody Parkey kick.
  Drive: 2 plays, 8 yards, 0:12. (ATL 20–10)
- PHI – 3:39 DeMarco Murray 5-yard TD pass from Sam Bradford, Cody Parkey kick.
  Drive: 13 plays, 95, yards, 6:10. (ATL 20–17)

Fourth quarter

- ATL – 10:49 Matt Bryant 44-yard FG.
  Drive: 14 plays, 62 yards, 7:50. (ATL 23–17)
- PHI – 8:37 Ryan Matthews 1-yard TD run, Cody Parkey kick.
  Drive: 6 plays, 80 yards, 2:12. (PHI 24–23)
- ATL – 6:27 Matt Bryant 51-yard FG.
  Drive: 5 plays, 51 yards, 2:10. (ATL 26–24)

Top passers

- PHI – Sam Bradford – 36/52, 336 YDS, 1 TD, 2 INT
- ATL – Matt Ryan – 23/34, 298 YDS, 2 TD, 2 INT

Top rushers

- PHI – Darren Sproles – 5 CAR, 50 YDS
- ATL – Tevin Coleman – 20 CAR, 80 YDS

Top receivers

- PHI – Jordan Matthews - 10 REC, 102 YDS
- ATL – Julio Jones - 9 REC, 141 YDS

Top tacklers

- PHI – Mychal Kendricks - 10 TACKLES
- ATL – Paul Worrilow - 13 TACKLES

With the win, the Falcons began their season 1–0.

==== Week 2: at New York Giants ====
Week Two: Atlanta Falcons at New York Giants – Game summary

Quarter	1	2	3	4	Total
Falcons	7	3	0	14	24
Giants	0	13	7	0	20

at MetLife Stadium, East Rutherford, New Jersey

- Date: September 20
- Game time: 1:00 pm. EDT
- Game weather: 74 °F (23 °C), sunny
- Game attendance: 77,678
- Referee: Brad Allen
- TV announcers (Fox): Kevin Burkhardt, John Lynch and Pam Oliver
- Recap, Gamebook

Game information

First quarter

- ATL – 0:34 Tevin Coleman 1-yard TD run, Matt Bryant kick.
  Drive: 13 plays, 86 yards, 4:19. (ATL 7–0)

Second quarter

- NYG – 10:06 Josh Brown 38-yard FG.
  Drive: 10 plays, 45 yards, 5:28. (ATL 7–3)
- ATL – 4:46 Matt Bryant 42-yard FG.
  Drive: 11 plays, 56 yards, 5:20. (ATL 10–3)
- NYG – 3:19 Odell Beckham Jr. 67-yard TD pass from Eli Manning, Josh Brown kick.
  Drive: 4 plays, 80, yards, 1:27. (TIE 10–10)
- NYG – 0:02 Josh Brown 44-yard FG.
  Drive: 6 plays, 30 yards, 0:56. (NYG 13–10)

Third quarter

- NYG – 10:53 Larry Donnell 10-yard TD pass from Eli Manning, Josh Brown kick.
  Drive: 9 plays, 69, yards, 4:07. (NYG 20–10)

Fourth quarter

- ATL – 12:39 Leonard Hankerson 10-yard TD pass from Matt Ryan, Matt Bryant kick.
  Drive: 12 plays, 91, yards, 6:36. (NYG 20–17)
- ATL – 1:14 Devonta Freeman 2-yard TD run, Matt Bryant kick.
  Drive: 7 plays, 70 yards, 1:58. (ATL 24–20)

Top passers

- ATL – Matt Ryan – 30/46, 363 YDS, 1 TD, 0 INT
- NYG – Eli Manning - 27/40, 292 YDS, 2 TD, 0 INT

Top rushers

- ATL – Tevin Coleman – 9 CAR, 32 YDS
- NYG – Andre Williams - 6 CAR, 43 YDS

Top receivers

- ATL – Julio Jones - 13 REC, 135 YDS
- NYG – Odell Beckham Jr. - 7 REC, 146 YDS

Top tacklers

- ATL – Justin Durant - 10 TACKLES
- NYG – Devon Kennard - 10 TACKLES

The Giants would lead 20–17 with below 2 minutes left, but Atlanta was able to pull off the comeback, scoring with 1:14 remaining after Devonta Freeman took it in from a yard out. New York tried to come back, but the Falcons would force a turnover on downs to end the game.

With the win, Atlanta improved to 2–0.

==== Week 3: at Dallas Cowboys ====
Week Three: Atlanta Falcons at Dallas Cowboys – Game summary

Quarter	1	2	3	4	Total
Falcons	7	10	8	14	39
Cowboys	14	14	0	0	28

at AT&T Stadium, Arlington, Texas

- Date: September 27
- Game time: 1:00 pm. EDT/12:00 p.m. CDT
- Game weather: Played indoors (retractable roof closed)
- Game attendance: 90,345
- Referee: Pete Morelli
- TV announcers (Fox): Joe Buck, Troy Aikman and Erin Andrews
- Recap, Gamebook

Game information

First quarter

- DAL – Joseph Randle 37-yard run (Dan Bailey kick), 14:03. Cowboys 7–0. Drive: 2 plays, 80 yards, 1:08.
- DAL – Joseph Randle 1-yard run (Dan Bailey kick), 7:12. Cowboys 14–0. Drive: 8 plays, 77 yards, 4:37.
- ATL – Devonta Freeman 3-yard run (Matt Bryant kick), 3:05. Cowboys 14–7. Drive: 11 plays, 80 yards, 4:07.

Second quarter

- DAL – Darren McFadden 2-yard run (Dan Bailey kick), 7:31. Cowboys 21–7. Drive: 8 plays, 56 yards, 5:09.
- ATL – Devonta Freeman 2-yard run (Matt Bryant kick), 2:23. Cowboys 21–14. Drive: 7 plays, 23 yards, 3:32.
- DAL – Joseph Randle 1-yard run (Dan Bailey kick), 0:46. Cowboys 28–14. Drive: 6 plays, 80 yards, 1:38.
- ATL – Matt Bryant 32-yard field goal, 0:05. Cowboys 28–17. Drive: 6 plays, 66 yards, 0:40.

Third quarter

- ATL – Julio Jones 45-yard pass from Matt Ryan (Levine Toilolo pass from Matt Ryan), 7:16. Cowboys 28–25. Drive: 6 plays, 87 yards, 3:15.

Fourth quarter

- ATL – Devonta Freeman 7-yard run (Matt Bryant kick), 11:30. Falcons 32–28. Drive: 11 plays, 89 yards, 6:44.
- ATL – Julio Jones 2-yard pass from Matt Ryan (Matt Bryant kick), 3:09. Falcons 39–28. Drive: 11 plays, 62 yards, 6:14.

Top passers

- ATL – Matt Ryan – 24/36, 285 yards, 2 TD
- DAL – Brandon Weeden – 22/26, 232 yards, INT

Top rushers

- ATL – Devonta Freeman – 30 rushes, 141 yards, 3 TD
- DAL – Joseph Randle – 14 rushes, 87 yards, 3 TD

Top receivers

- ATL – Julio Jones – 12 receptions, 164 yards, 2 TD
- DAL – Lance Dunbar – 10 receptions, 100 yards

Top tacklers

- ATL – Justin Durant - 8 tackles, 1 assist
- DAL – Sean Lee - 7 tackles, 3 assists

The Falcons would trail 14–28 at one point, but they would pull off their second comeback in as many weeks, as they scored 25 unanswered points afterwards to ultimately win 39–28.

With the win, the Falcons improved to 3–0 for the first time since 2012.

==== Week 4: vs. Houston Texans ====
Week Four: Houston Texans at Atlanta Falcons – Game summary

Quarter	1	2	3	4	Total
Texans	0	0	0	21	21
Falcons	7	21	14	6	48

at Georgia Dome, Atlanta, Georgia

- Date: October 4
- Game time: 1:00 pm. EDT
- Game weather: Played indoors (dome stadium)
- Game attendance: 69,904
- Referee: Carl Cheffers
- TV announcers (CBS): Kevin Harlan and Rich Gannon
- Recap, Gamebook

Game information

First quarter

- ATL – 8:32 Devonta Freeman 16-yard TD run, Matt Bryant kick.
  Drive: 8 plays, 54 yards, 3:29. (ATL 7–0)

Second quarter

- ATL – 14:39 Devonta Freeman 23-yard TD run, Matt Bryant kick.
  Drive: 10 plays, 71 yards, 6:19. (ATL 14–0)
- ATL – 12:24 Desmond Trufant 24-yard TD fumble recovery, Matt Bryant kick.
  Drive: 2 plays, -7 yards, 0:16. (ATL 21–0)
- ATL – 3:11 Leonard Hankerson 3-yard TD pass from Matt Ryan, Matt Bryant kick.
  Drive: 11 plays, 82 yards, 6:20. (ATL 28–0)

Third quarter

- ATL – 10:50 Devonta Freeman 6-yard TD run, Matt Bryant kick.
  Drive: 4 plays, 68 yards, 1:56. (ATL 35–0)
- ATL – 2:56 Terron Ward 8-yard TD run, Matt Bryant kick.
  Drive: 9 plays, 70 yards, 6:17. (ATL 42–0)

Fourth quarter

- HOU – 14:22 C. J. Fiedorowicz 5-yard TD pass from Brian Hoyer, Nick Novak kick.
  Drive: 10 plays, 80 yards, 3:34. (ATL 42–7)
- HOU – 9:09 Chris Polk 1-yard TD run, Nick Novak kick.
  Drive: 10 plays, 75 yards, 2:47. (ATL 42–14)
- HOU – 3:01 Cecil Shorts III 8-yard TD pass from Brian Hoyer, Nick Novak kick.
  Drive: 6 plays, 64 yards, 1:31. (ATL 42–21)
- ATL – 0:00 Nate Stupar 84-yard TD fumble recovery.
  Drive: 10 plays, 38 yards, 1:50. (ATL 48–21)

Top passers

- HOU – Brian Hoyer - 17/30, 232 YDS, 2 TD, 0 INT
- ATL – Matt Ryan – 19/27, 256 YDS, 1 TD, 0 INT

Top rushers

- HOU – Chris Polk - 3 CAR, 27 YDS
- ATL – Terron Ward – 19 CAR, 72 YDS

Top receivers

- HOU – DeAndre Hopkins - 9 REC, 157
- ATL – Leonard Hankerson - 6 REC, 103 YDS

Top tacklers

- HOU – Brian Cushing - 11 TACKLES
- ATL – Nate Stupar - 6 TACKLES

The Falcons routed the Texans 48–21 at home. Atlanta would build a 42–0 lead, but Houston put up a fight, as they would outscore Atlanta 21–6 for the remainder of the game. However, the Falcons still won in a blowout.

With the win, the Falcons improved to 4–0.

==== Week 5: vs. Washington Redskins ====
Week Five: Washington Redskins at Atlanta Falcons – Game summary

Quarter	1	2	3	4	OT	Total
Redskins	0	7	0	12	0	19
Falcons	0	3	3	13	6	25

at Georgia Dome, Atlanta, Georgia

- Date: October 11
- Game time: 1:00 pm. EDT
- Game weather: Played indoors (dome stadium)
- Game attendance: 70,178
- Referee: Bill Vinovich
- TV announcers (Fox): Chris Myers, Ronde Barber and Jennifer Hale
- Recap, Gamebook

Game information

First quarter No Scoring Second quarter

- WAS – 12:12 Derek Carrier 7-yard TD pass from Kirk Cousins, Dustin Hopkins kick.
  Drive: 12 plays, 67 yards, 6:47. (WAS 7–0)
- ATL – 7:07 Matt Bryant 42-yard FG.
  Drive: 12 plays, 56 yards, 5:05. (WAS 7–3)

Third quarter

- ATL – 1:54 Matt Bryant 28-yard FG.
  Drive: 11 plays, 47 yards, 4:47. (WAS 7–6)

Fourth quarter

- ATL – 9:14 Julio Jones 0-yard TD fumble recovery.
  Drive: 11 plays, 91 yards, 6:32. (ATL 12–7)
- WAS – 7:59 Matt Jones 2-yard TD run.
  Drive: 3 plays, 80 yards, 1:15. (WAS 13–12)
- WAS – 2:38 Dustin Hopkins 28-yard FG.
  Drive: 6 plays, 11 yards, 3:06. (WAS 16–12)
- ATL – 0:24 Devonta Freeman 6-yard TD run, Matt Bryant kick.
  Drive: 10 plays, 80 yards, 2:14. (ATL 19–16)
- WAS – 0:00 Dustin Hopkins 52-yard FG.
  Drive: 4 plays, 46 yards, 0:24. (TIE 19–19)

Overtime

- ATL – 12:15 Robert Alford 59-yard TD interception.
  Drive: 6 plays, 30 yards, 2:45. (ATL 25–16)

Top passers

- WAS – Kirk Cousins – 21/32, 219 YDS, 1 TD, 2 INT
- ATL – Matt Ryan – 24/42, 254 YDS, 0 TD, 2 INT

Top rushers

- WAS – Matt Jones - 11 CAR, 20 YDS
- ATL – Devonta Freeman – 27 CAR, 153 YDS

Top receivers

- WAS – Jamison Crowder - 8 REC, 87
- ATL – Jacob Tamme - 8 REC, 94 YDS

Top tacklers

- WAS – Dashon Goldson - 10 TACKLES
- ATL – Paul Worrilow - 9 TACKLES

the Falcons would win this game in overtime against the Redskins. In overtime, the game was sealed away after Robert Alford returned an interception 59 yards for a touchdown to end the game.

With the win, Atlanta started 5–0 for the first time since 2012.

==== Week 6: at New Orleans Saints ====
Week Six: Atlanta Falcons at New Orleans Saints – Game summary

Quarter	1	2	3	4	Total
Falcons	0	7	0	14	21
Saints	14	0	10	7	31

at Mercedes-Benz Superdome, New Orleans, Louisiana

- Date: October 15
- Game time: 8:25 pm. EDT/7:25 pm. CDT
- Game weather: Played indoors (dome stadium)
- Game attendance: 73,018
- Referee: Gene Steratore
- TV announcers (CBS/NFLN): Jim Nantz, Phil Simms and Tracy Wolfson
- Recap, Gamebook

Game information

First quarter

- NO – 9:44 Mark Ingram II 2-yard TD run, Zach Hocker kick.
  Drive: 12 plays, 80 yards, 5:16. (NO 7–0)
- NO – 2:06 Michael Mauti blocked punt returned 4-yards for TD, Zach Hocker kick.
  Drive: 3 plays, -4 yards, 2:15. (NO 14–0)

Second quarter

- ATL – 14:12 Roddy White 7-yard TD pass from Matt Ryan, Matt Bryant kick.
  Drive: 9 plays, 80 yards, 2:54. (NO 14–7)

Third quarter

- NO – 7:19 Zach Hocker 31-yard FG.
  Drive: 11 plays, 56 yards, 4:55. (NO 17–7)
- NO – 2:23 Benjamin Watson 2-yard TD pass from Drew Brees, Zach Hocker kick.
  Drive: 10 plays, 63 yards, 4:19. (NO 24–7)

Fourth quarter

- ATL – 13:07 Devonta Freeman 25-yard TD run, Matt Bryant kick.
  Drive: 10 plays, 80 yards, 4:16. (NO 24–14)
- NO – 8:02 Mark Ingram II 1-yard TD run, Zach Hocker kick.
  Drive: 11 plays, 80 yards, 5:05. (NO 31–14)
- ATL – 1:29 Devonta Freeman 13-yard TD pass from Matt Ryan, Matt Bryant kick.
  Drive: 11 plays, 62 yards, 5:05. (NO 31–21)

Top passers

- ATL – Matt Ryan – 30/44, 295 YDS, 2 TD, 0 INT
- NO – Drew Brees - 30/39, 312 YDS, 1 TD, 0 INT

Top rushers

- ATL – Devonta Freeman – 13 CAR, 100 YDS
- NO – Mark Ingram II - 20 CAR, 46 YDS

Top receivers

- ATL – Julio Jones - 6 REC, 93 YDS
- NO – Benjamin Watson - 10 REC, 127 YDS

Top tacklers

- ATL – Paul Worrilow - 9 TACKLES
- NO – Dannell Ellerbe - 14 TACKLES

The Falcons suffered their first loss of the season in New Orleans on Thursday Night Football. The Saints would lead the entire game. The Falcons would tie it, but that was the closest they would come to striking distance, as the Saints won 31–21.

With the loss, the Falcons fell to 5–1.

==== Week 7: at Tennessee Titans ====
Week Seven: Atlanta Falcons at Tennessee Titans – Game summary

Quarter	1	2	3	4	Total
Falcons	0	3	7	0	10
Titans	0	7	0	0	7

at Nissan Stadium, Nashville, Tennessee

- Date: October 25
- Game time: 1:00 pm. EDT/12:00 pm. CDT
- Game weather: 59 °F (15 °C), cloudy
- Game attendance: 63,329
- Referee: Brad Allen
- TV announcers (Fox): Thom Brennaman, Charles Davis and Tony Siragusa
- Recap, Gamebook

Game information

First quarter No Scoring Second quarter

- TEN – 8:42 Kendall Wright 19-yard TD pass from Zach Mettenberger, Ryan Succop kick.
  Drive: 1 play, 19 yards, 0:07. (TEN 7–0)
- ATL – 2:31 Matt Bryant 27-yard FG.
  Drive: 11 plays, 55 yards, 6:11. (TEN 7–3)

Third quarter

- ATL – 5:56 Julio Jones 8-yard TD pass from Matt Ryan, Matt Bryant kick.
  Drive: 9 plays, 88 yards, 4:30. (ATL 10–7)

Fourth quarter No Scoring

Top passers

- ATL – Matt Ryan – 22/38, 295 YDS, 1 TD, 2 INT
- TEN – Zach Mettenberger – 22/35, 295 YDS, 1 TD, 2 INT

Top rushers

- ATL – Devonta Freeman – 25 CAR, 116 YDS
- TEN – Antonio Andrews – 10 CAR, 57 YDS

Top receivers

- ATL – Julio Jones - 9 REC, 92 YDS
- TEN – Delanie Walker - 7 REC, 55 YDS

Top tacklers

- ATL – Justin Durant - 8 TACKLES
- TEN – Wesley Woodyard - 9 TACKLES

With the win, the Falcons improved to 6–1.

==== Week 8: vs. Tampa Bay Buccaneers ====
Week Eight: Tampa Bay Buccaneers at Atlanta Falcons – Game summary

Quarter	1	2	3	4	OT	Total
Buccaneers	3	10	7	0	3	23
Falcons	3	0	7	10	0	20

at Georgia Dome, Atlanta, Georgia

- Date: November 1
- Game time: 1:00 pm. EST
- Game weather: Played indoors (dome stadium)
- Game attendance: 70,524
- Referee: Ron Torbert
- TV announcers (Fox): Justin Kutcher, Charles Davis and Tony Siragusa
- Recap, Gamebook

Game information

First quarter

- ATL – 7:54 Matt Bryant 21-yard FG.
  Drive: 14 plays, 71 yards, 7:06. (ATL 3–0)
- TB – 2:03 Connor Barth 38-yard FG.
  Drive: 4 plays, 1 yard, 0:58. (TIE 3–3)

Second quarter

- TB – 3:32 Connor Barth 23-yard FG.
  Drive: 10 plays, 73 yards, 5:32. (TB 6–3)
- TB – 0:30 Cameron Brate 20-yard TD pass from Jameis Winston, Connor Barth kick.
  Drive: 6 plays, 50 yards, 0:53. (TB 13–3)

Third quarter

- TB – 6:06 Jameis Winston 4-yard TD run, Connor Barth kick.
  Drive: 7 plays, 76 yards, 3:56. (TB 20–3)
- ATL – 0:15 Jacob Tamme 7-yard TD pass from Matt Ryan, Matt Bryant kick.
  Drive: 5 plays, 40 yards, 1:35. (TB 20–10)

Fourth quarter

- ATL – 4:56 Matt Bryant 24-yard FG.
  Drive: 14 plays, 77 yards, 7:11. (TB 20–13)
- ATL – 0:17 Julio Jones 8-yard TD pass from Matt Ryan, Matt Bryant kick.
  Drive: 5 plays, 40 yards, 1:35. (TIE 20–20)

Overtime

- TB – 7:52 Connor Barth 31-yard FG.
  Drive: 15 plays, 68 yards, 7:08. (TB 23–20)

Top passers

- TB – Jameis Winston – 16/29, 177 YDS, 1 TD, 0 INT
- ATL – Matt Ryan – 37/45, 397 YDS, 2 TD, 1 INT

Top rushers

- TB – Doug Martin - 23 CAR, 71 YDS
- ATL – Devonta Freeman – 21 CAR, 88 YDS

Top receivers

- TB – Cameron Brate - 2 REC, 48 YDS
- ATL – Julio Jones - 12 REC, 162 YDS

Top tacklers

- TB – Kwon Alexander - 11 TACKLES
- ATL – Ricardo Allen - 6 TACKLES

With the loss, the Falcons fell to 6–2.

==== Week 9: at San Francisco 49ers ====
Week Nine: Atlanta Falcons at San Francisco 49ers – Game summary

Quarter	1	2	3	4	Total
Falcons	3	10	0	3	16
49ers	0	17	0	0	17

at Levi's Stadium, Santa Clara, California

- Date: November 8
- Game time: 4:05 pm. EST/1:05 p.m. PST
- Game weather: 58 °F (14 °C), cloudy
- Game attendance: 70,799
- Referee: Tony Corrente
- TV announcers (Fox): Chris Myers, Ronde Barber and Jennifer Hale
- Recap, Gamebook

Game information

First quarter

- ATL – 9:24 Matt Bryant 44-yard FG.
  Drive: 9 plays, 46 yards, 3:38. (ATL 3–0)

Second quarter

- SF – 13:41 Garrett Celek 1-yard TD pass from Blaine Gabbert, Phil Dawson kick.
  Drive: 12 plays, 84 yards, 6:26. (SF 7–3)
- ATL – 6:05 Matt Bryant 36-yard FG.
  Drive: 5 plays, 27 yards, 1:28. (SF 7–6)
- SF – 3:20 Phil Dawson 44-yard FG.
  Drive: 9 plays, 41 yards, 2:45. (SF 10–6)
- SF – 1:16 Garrett Celek 11-yard TD pass from Blaine Gabbert, Phil Dawson kick.
  Drive: 5 plays, 57 yards, 1:09. (SF 17–6)
- ATL – 0:13 Devonta Freeman 17-yard TD pass from Matt Ryan, Matt Bryant kick.
  Drive: 3 plays, 78 yards, 1:03. (SF 17–13)

Third quarter No Scoring Fourth quarter

- ATL – 2:56 Matt Bryant 19-yard FG.
  Drive: 10 plays, 66 yards, 4:18. (SF 17–16)

Top passers

- ATL – Matt Ryan – 30/45, 303 YDS, 1 TD, 0 INT
- SF – Blaine Gabbert - 15/25, 2 TD, 2 INT

Top rushers

- ATL – Devonta Freeman – 12 CAR, 12 YDS
- SF – Shaun Draughn - 16 CAR, 58 YDS

Top receivers

- ATL – Julio Jones - 10 REC, 137 YDS
- SF – Quinton Patton - 3 REC, 70 YDS

Top tacklers

- ATL – Philip Wheeler - 10 TACKLES
- SF – Marcus Cromartie - 7 TACKLES

This game was notable for Dan Quinn choosing to kick a field goal at 1 yard line with 1:49 left in the fourth quarter rather than going for it on 4th down, resulting in a bitter loss that dropped the Falcons to 6–3.

==== Week 11: vs. Indianapolis Colts ====
Week Eleven: Indianapolis Colts at Atlanta Falcons – Game summary

Quarter	1	2	3	4	Total
Colts	0	7	7	10	24
Falcons	7	7	7	0	21

at Georgia Dome, Atlanta, Georgia

- Date: November 22
- Game time: 1:00 pm. EST
- Game weather: Played indoors (dome stadium)
- Game attendance: 70,433
- Referee: Walt Anderson
- TV announcers (CBS): Greg Gumbel, Trent Green and Jamie Erdahl
- Recap, Gamebook

Game information

First quarter

- ATL – 0:02 Patrick DiMarco 15-yard TD pass from Matt Ryan, Matt Bryant kick.
  Drive: 12 plays, 80 yards, 5:28. (ATL 7–0)

Second quarter

- ATL – 8:54 Patrick DiMarco 15-yard TD pass from Matt Ryan, Matt Bryant kick.
  Drive: 10 plays, 83 yards, 4:18. (ATL 14–0)
- IND – 1:55 Ahmad Bradshaw 7-yard TD pass from Matt Hasselbeck, Adam Vinatieri kick.
  Drive: 13 plays, 80 yards, 6:59. (ATL 14–7)

Third quarter

- ATL – 9:38 Leonard Hankerson 3-yard TD pass from Matt Ryan, Matt Bryant kick.
  Drive: 10 plays, 80 yards, 5:22. (ATL 21–7)
- IND – 0:10 Ahmad Bradshaw 7-yard TD pass from Matt Hasselbeck, Adam Vinatieri kick.
  Drive: 10 plays, 90 yards, 4:58. (ATL 21–14)

Fourth quarter

- IND – 10:07 D'Qwell Jackson 6-yard TD interception, Adam Vinatieri kick.
  Drive: 1 plays, 0 yards, 0:07. (TIE 21–21)
- IND – 0:52 Adam Vinatieri 43-yard FG.
  Drive: 9 plays, 56 yards, 4:02. (IND 24–21)

Top passers

- IND – Matt Hasselbeck - 23/32, 280 YDS, 2 TD, 2 INT
- ATL – Matt Ryan – 25/46, 280 YDS, 3 TD, 3 INT

Top rushers

- IND – Frank Gore - 14 CAR, 34 YDS
- ATL – Tevin Coleman – 17 CAR, 48 YDS

Top receivers

- IND – Frank Gore - 5 REC, 46 YDS
- ATL – Julio Jones - 9 REC, 160 YDS

Top tacklers

- IND – Jerrell Freeman - 9 TACKLES
- ATL – Justin Durant - 9 TACKLES

The Falcons would lead 21–7 at one point, but Indianapolis would rally to erase it after D'Qwell Jackson returned an interception 6 yards to tie it at 21. The Colts would eventually go down the field to win it with an Adam Vinatieri field goal from 43 yards with 52 seconds left.

With the loss, Atlanta fell to 6–4.

==== Week 12: vs. Minnesota Vikings ====
Week Twelve: Minnesota Vikings at Atlanta Falcons – Game summary

Quarter	1	2	3	4	Total
Vikings	7	0	3	10	20
Falcons	0	3	0	7	10

at Georgia Dome, Atlanta, Georgia

- Date: November 29
- Game time: 1:00 pm. EST
- Game weather: Played indoors (dome stadium)
- Game attendance: 70,610
- Referee: Clete Blakeman
- TV announcers (Fox): Kevin Burkhardt, John Lynch and Pam Oliver
- Recap, Gamebook

Game information

First quarter

Second quarter

Third quarter

Fourth quarter

Top passers

- MIN –
- ATL –

Top rushers

- MIN –
- ATL –

Top receivers

- MIN –
- ATL –

Top tacklers

- MIN –
- ATL –

With the loss, the Falcons fell to 6–5.

==== Week 13: at Tampa Bay Buccaneers ====
Week Thirteen: Atlanta Falcons at Tampa Bay Buccaneers – Game summary

Quarter	1	2	3	4	Total
Falcons	0	9	3	7	19
Buccaneers	7	0	9	7	23

at Raymond James Stadium, Tampa, Florida

- Date: December 6
- Game time: 1:00 pm. EST
- Game weather: 79 °F (26 °C), cloudy
- Game attendance: 58,221
- Referee: Ed Hochuli
- TV announcers (Fox): Dick Stockton, David Diehl and Kristina Pink
- Recap, Gamebook

Game information

First quarter

Second quarter

Third quarter

Fourth quarter

Top passers

- ATL –
- TB –

Top rushers

- ATL –
- TB –

Top receivers

- ATL –
- TB –

Top tacklers

- ATL –
- TB –

With the loss, the Falcons fell to 6–6.

==== Week 14: at Carolina Panthers ====
Week Fourteen: Atlanta Falcons at Carolina Panthers – Game summary

Quarter	1	2	3	4	Total
Falcons	0	0	0	0	0
Panthers	21	7	10	0	38

at Bank of America Stadium, Charlotte, North Carolina

- Date: December 13
- Game time: 1:00 pm. EST
- Game weather: 63 °F (17 °C), sunny
- Game attendance: 74,420
- Referee: Tony Corrente
- TV announcers (Fox): Kevin Burkhardt, John Lynch and Pam Oliver
- Recap, Gamebook

Game information

First quarter

- CAR – Jonathan Stewart 1-yard run (Graham Gano kick), 11:28. Panthers 7–0. Drive: 8 plays, 80 yards, 3:32.
- CAR – Ted Ginn Jr. 74-yard pass from Cam Newton (Graham Gano kick), 6:48. Panthers 14–0. Drive: 3 plays, 93 yards, 1:18.
- CAR – Ted Ginn Jr. 46-yard pass from Cam Newton (Graham Gano kick), 0:12. Panthers 21–0. Drive: 7 plays, 80 yards, 3:23.

Second quarter

- CAR – Ed Dickson 4-yard pass from Cam Newton (Graham Gano kick), 0:17. Panthers 28–0. Drive: 10 plays, 81 yards, 3:27.

Third quarter

- CAR – Graham Gano 38-yard field goal, 5:46. Panthers 31–0. Drive: 9 plays, 23 yards, 4:45.
- CAR – Fozzy Whittaker 16-yard run (Graham Gano kick), 2:18. Panthers 38–0. Drive: 4 plays, 26 yards, 1:57.

Fourth quarter

- No scoring plays.

Top passers

- ATL – Matt Ryan – 22/34, 224 yards, INT
- CAR – Cam Newton – 15/21, 265 yards, 3 TD

Top rushers

- ATL – Devonta Freeman – 12 rushes, 40 yards
- CAR – Jonathan Stewart – 10 rushes, 75 yards, TD

Top receivers

- ATL – Julio Jones – 7 receptions, 88 yards
- CAR – Ted Ginn Jr. – 2 receptions, 120 yards, 2 TD

The Falcons would suffer a blowout and shutout loss to undefeated Carolina. The Falcons would struggle all day, as the Panthers romped them 38–0, their worst shutout loss since 2004.

With the loss, the Falcons fell to 6–7. This is the first and only time they had been under .500 all season.

==== Week 15: at Jacksonville Jaguars ====
Week Fifteen: Atlanta Falcons at Jacksonville Jaguars – Game summary

Quarter	1	2	3	4	Total
Falcons	7	10	0	6	23
Jaguars	0	3	14	0	17

at EverBank Field, Jacksonville, Florida

- Date: December 20
- Game time: 1:00 pm. EST
- Game weather: 65 °F (18 °C), clear
- Game attendance: 64,016
- Referee: Bill Vinovich
- TV announcers (Fox): Dick Stockton, David Diehl and Kristina Pink
- Recap, Gamebook

Game information

First quarter

Second quarter

Third quarter

Fourth quarter

Top passers

- ATL –
- JAX –

Top rushers

- ATL –
- JAX –

Top receivers

- ATL –
- JAX –

Top tacklers

- ATL –
- JAX –

With the win, the Falcons improved to 7–7. They finished 3-1 vs AFC South.

==== Week 16: vs. Carolina Panthers ====
Week Sixteen: Carolina Panthers at Atlanta Falcons – Game summary

Quarter	1	2	3	4	Total
Panthers	7	0	3	3	13
Falcons	0	7	7	6	20

at Georgia Dome, Atlanta, Georgia

- Date: December 27
- Game time: 1:00 pm. EST
- Game weather: Played indoors (dome stadium)
- Game attendance: 70,981
- Referee: John Parry
- TV announcers (Fox): Kevin Burkhardt, John Lynch and Pam Oliver
- Recap, Gamebook

Game information

First quarter

Second quarter

Third quarter

Fourth quarter

Top passers

- CAR –
- ATL –

Top rushers

- CAR –
- ATL –

Top receivers

- CAR –
- ATL –

Top tacklers

- CAR –
- ATL –

In a major upset win, the Atlanta Falcons defeated Carolina 20–13, spoiling the Panthers' run at a perfect season. Unfortunately for the Falcons, they were eliminated from playoff contention due to the Minnesota Vikings' 49–17 win against the New York Giants later in the day.

==== Week 17: vs. New Orleans Saints ====
Week Seventeen: New Orleans Saints at Atlanta Falcons – Game summary

Quarter	1	2	3	4	Total
Saints	7	7	3	3	20
Falcons	3	14	0	0	17

at Georgia Dome, Atlanta, Georgia

- Date: January 3, 2016
- Game time: 1:00 pm. EST
- Game weather: Played indoors (dome stadium)
- Game attendance: 69,699
- Referee: Craig Wrolstad
- TV announcers (Fox): Sam Rosen, Matt Millen and Peter Schrager
- Recap, Gamebook

Game information

First quarter

Second quarter

Third quarter

Fourth quarter

Top passers

- NO –
- ATL –

Top rushers

- NO –
- ATL –

Top receivers

- NO –
- ATL –

Top tacklers

- NO –
- ATL –

With the loss, the Falcons ended their season 8–8, and finished 1–5 against their division. For the first time since the 2013 season, they were swept by the New Orleans Saints who also finished their season with a 7-9 Record.

== Statistics ==
=== Team leaders ===
Category	Player(s)	Value
Passing yards	Matt Ryan	4,591
Passing touchdowns	Matt Ryan	21
Rushing yards	Devonta Freeman	1,061
Rushing touchdowns	Devonta Freeman	11
Receptions	Julio Jones	136
Receiving yards	Julio Jones	1,871
Receiving touchdowns	Julio Jones	8
Points	Matt Bryant	83
Kickoff return yards	Eric Weems	403
Punt return yards	Eric Weems	221
Tackles	Paul Worrilow	95
Sacks	Vic Beasley	4.0
Interceptions	Ricardo Allen	3
Forced fumbles	Vic Beasley	2

Stats as of week 16.

== Standings ==
=== Division ===
NFC South
	W	L	T	PCT	DIV	CONF	PF	PA	STK
^{(1)} Carolina Panthers	15	1	0	.938	5–1	11–1	500	308	W1
Atlanta Falcons	8	8	0	.500	1–5	5–7	339	345	L1
New Orleans Saints	7	9	0	.438	3–3	5–7	408	476	W2
Tampa Bay Buccaneers	6	10	0	.375	3–3	5–7	342	417	L4

=== Conference ===
NFC
#	Team	Division	W	L	T	PCT	DIV	CONF	SOS	SOV	STK
Division Leaders
1	Carolina Panthers	South	15	1	0	.938	5–1	11–1	.441	.438	W1
2	Arizona Cardinals	West	13	3	0	.813	4–2	10–2	.477	.457	L1
3	Minnesota Vikings	North	11	5	0	.688	5–1	8–4	.504	.449	W3
4	Washington Redskins	East	9	7	0	.563	4–2	8–4	.465	.403	W4
Wild Cards
5 (Note: Green Bay finished ahead of Seattle based on head-to-head victory.)	Green Bay Packers	North	10	6	0	.625	3–3	7–5	.531	.450	L2
6	Seattle Seahawks	West	10	6	0	.625	3–3	7–5	.520	.431	W1
Did not qualify for the postseason
7	Atlanta Falcons	South	8	8	0	.500	1–5	5–7	.480	.453	L1
8 (Note: St. Louis and Detroit finished ahead of Philadelphia and New Orleans based on conference record. St. Louis finished ahead of Detroit based on head-to-head victory. Detroit finished ahead of Philadelphia and New Orleans based on head-to-head sweep, while Philadelphia finished ahead of New Orleans based on head-to-head victory.)	St. Louis Rams	West	7	9	0	.438	4–2	6–6	.527	.482	L1
9	Detroit Lions	North	7	9	0	.438	3–3	6–6	.535	.429	W3
10	Philadelphia Eagles	East	7	9	0	.438	3–3	4–8	.508	.473	W1
11	New Orleans Saints	South	7	9	0	.438	3–3	5–7	.504	.402	W2
12 (Note: The New York Giants and Chicago each finished ahead of Tampa Bay based on head-to-head victory, while the Giants finished ahead of Chicago based on conference record.)	New York Giants	East	6	10	0	.375	2–4	4–8	.500	.396	L3
13	Chicago Bears	North	6	10	0	.375	1–5	3–9	.547	.469	L1
14	Tampa Bay Buccaneers	South	6	10	0	.375	3–3	5–7	.484	.406	L4
15	San Francisco 49ers	West	5	11	0	.313	1–5	4–8	.539	.463	W1
16	Dallas Cowboys	East	4	12	0	.250	3–3	3–9	.531	.438	L4
Tiebreakers (Note: When breaking ties for three or more teams under the NFL's rules, they are first broken within divisions, then comparing only the highest-ranked remaining team from each division.)
