= Francis Tenaglio =

American politician

Francis X. Tenaglio

Member of the Pennsylvania House of Representatives from the 159th district
- In office 1977–1978
- Preceded by: Thomas Worrilow
- Succeeded by: Arthur Earley

Personal details
- Born: January 8, 1949 (age 77) Philadelphia, Pennsylvania
- Party: Democratic
- Children: Lynn Marie Leonard and Michael Tenaglio
- Education: West Chester University
- Occupation: retired social studies teacher

Francis X. Tenaglio (born January 8, 1949) is an American politician who served as a Democratic member of the Pennsylvania House of Representatives 159th district from 1977 to 1978.

Tenaglio ran unsuccessfully for Governor of New Jersey in 2005 and for US Congress in New Jersey's 1st congressional district in 2012.

== Early life and education ==
Tenaglio was born in Philadelphia, Pennsylvania and graduated from Cardinal O'Hara High School in Springfield, Pennsylvania.

He received a B.Sc. degree from West Chester State College (now known as West Chester University) in 1971.

== Civilian career ==
Tenaglio worked as a senior teller at Western Savings Bank, a licensed real estate salesperson, an account executive for Rothacker Advertising (1982–1984), manager and director of marketing Sharon Savings Bank (1984–1991) and as a social studies teacher at South Philadelphia High School (1991–2005).

== Political career ==
Tenaglio was a member of the Chester Democratic Committee and was elected as a Democrat to the Pennsylvania House of Representatives, 159th district for the 1977 term. He was an unsuccessful candidate for reelection to the House in 1979 and was succeeded by Arthur Earley.

Tenaglio had an unsuccessful campaign for Governor of New Jersey in 2005 and for U.S. Congress in the Democratic Primary of New Jersey's 1st congressional district against incumbent Rob Andrews.

== Personal life ==
Tenaglio is the author of three books:

- A Declaration of American Intentions – A U.S. Citizenship Self Help Guide (2014)
- How Mr. Donaldson Does Washington (2015)
- Poems From an Irish Mind (2017)

Pennsylvania House of Representatives
Preceded by Thomas Worrilow	Member of the Pennsylvania House of Representatives from the 159th district 1977–1978	Succeeded by Arthur Earley
