= John E. Gremminger =

American politician

Member of the Pennsylvania House of Representatives from the Delaware County district
- In office 1961–1962
- Succeeded by: Thomas Worrilow

Member of the U.S. House of Representatives from 's Pennsylvania House of Representatives, Delaware County district
- In office 1965–1966
- Preceded by: Thomas Worrilow

Personal details
- Born: March 13, 1909
- Died: July 1977
- Resting place: Lawn Croft Cemetery, Linwood, Pennsylvania, U.S.
- Party: Democratic

John E. Gremminger (March 13, 1909 – July, 1977) was an American politician from Pennsylvania who served as a Democratic member of the Pennsylvania House of Representatives for Delaware County from 1961 to 1962 and from 1965 to 1966.

== Career ==
Gremminger was born in Chester, Pennsylvania and graduated from the public schools. He was elected to the Pennsylvania House of Representatives for Delaware County and served from 1961 to 1962. He was a member of the Chester City Democratic Committee. He served as chair of the Chester City Democratic Ward and was elected and served as constable for Chester from 1956 to 1959.

Gremminger was employed by the Pennsylvania Department of Highways from 1956 to 1960. He served as secretary and treasurer of the Transport Workers Union.

Gremminger was elected to the Pennsylvania House of Representatives for Delaware County and served from 1961 to 1962. He lost reelection to Thomas Worrilow in 1962 but won the seat back from him in 1964 and served from 1965 to 1966. He had unsuccessful reelection campaigns for the Pennsylvania House of Representatives in 1958, 1962, 1966 and 1968.

Gremminger was employed as recorder of deeds for the Delaware County Courthouse.

Gremminger is interred at the Lawn Croft Cemetery in Linwood, Pennsylvania.
