= Justin Durant =

American football player (born 1985)

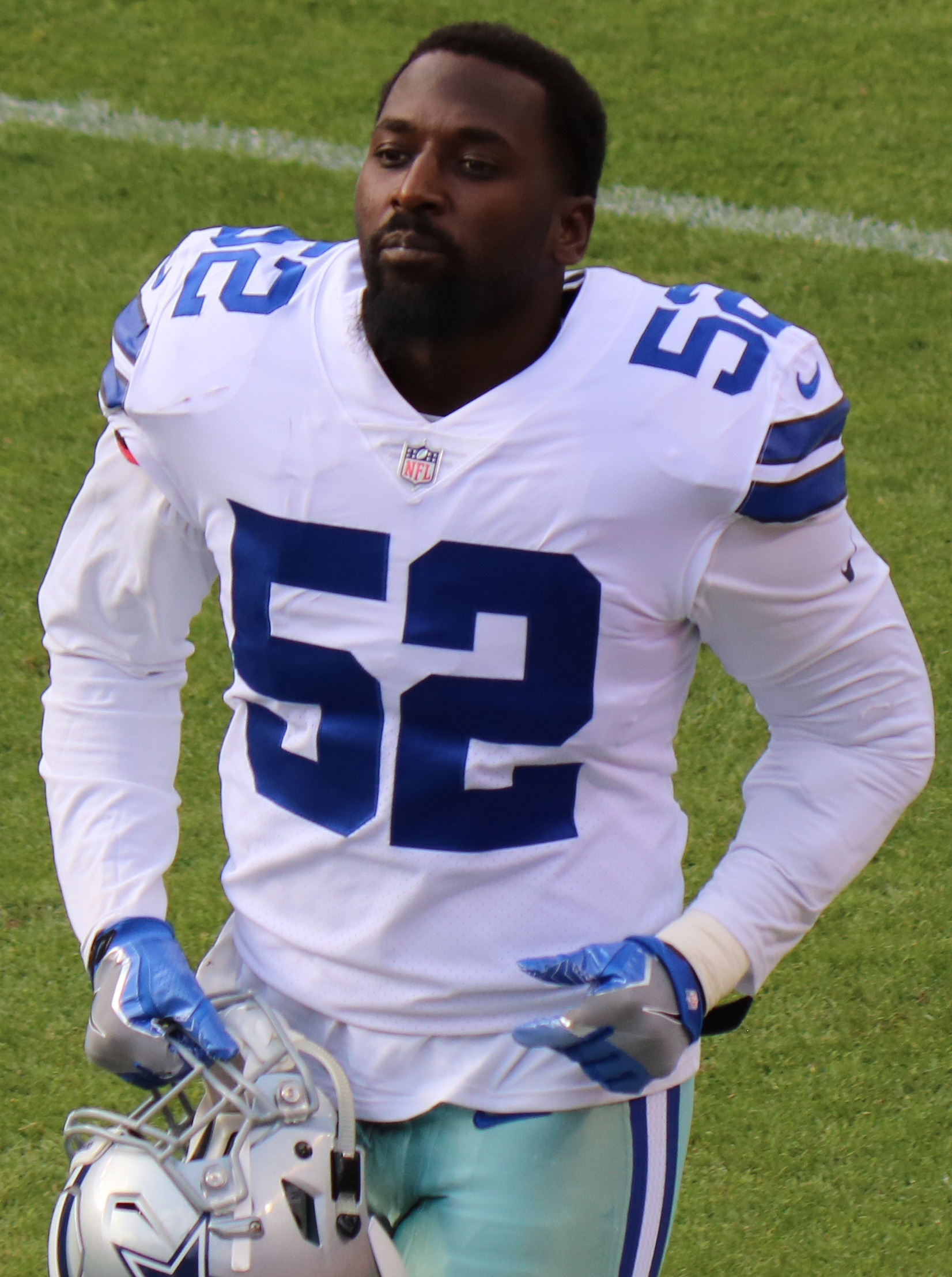
- Durant with the Dallas Cowboys in 2017

No. 52, 56
- Position: Linebacker

Personal information
- Born: September 21, 1985 (age 41); Florence, South Carolina, U.S.
- Listed height: 6 ft 4 in (1.93 m)
- Listed weight: 230 lb (104 kg)

Career information
- High school: Wilson (Florence)
- College: Hampton (2003–2006)
- NFL draft: 2007: 2nd round, 48th overall pick

Career history
- Jacksonville Jaguars (2007–2010); Detroit Lions (2011–2012); Dallas Cowboys (2013–2014); Atlanta Falcons (2015); Dallas Cowboys (2016–2017)

Awards and highlights
- 2× Division I-AA All-American (2005, 2006); 3× HBCU All-American (2004–2006); 3× MEAC Defensive Player of the Year (2004–2006); 3× First-team All-MEAC (2004–2006)

Career NFL statistics
- Total tackles: 650
- Sacks: 4.5
- Forced fumbles: 5
- Fumble recoveries: 3
- Interceptions: 3
- Stats at Pro Football Reference

Justin Ryan Durant (born September 21, 1985) is an American former professional football player who was a linebacker in the National Football League (NFL). He played college football for the Hampton Pirates and was selected by the Jacksonville Jaguars in the second round of the 2007 NFL draft. He played in the NFL for the Jaguars, Detroit Lions, Dallas Cowboys, and Atlanta Falcons.

== Early life ==
Durant graduated from Wilson High School in Florence, South Carolina in 2003. As a freshman, he was tried out at fullback, before settling in at linebacker. He was a four-year starter and a teammate of future NFL player Lawrence Timmons.

He was a member of the 2002 HSSR All-State team and was twice named to the Region VI Class AAA All-Region team. He was rated as a two-star prospect by Rivals.com.

== College career ==
Durant accepted a football scholarship from Hampton University. As a true freshman, he appeared in 8 games and missed 3 contests with a hand injury. He played mostly as a backup outside linebacker and on special teams, collecting 32 defensive tackles. He started 4 games at middle linebacker. He had 6 tackles against Villanova University. He made 7 tackles, one sack and a pass defensed against Morgan State University.

As a sophomore, he started in 11 out of 12 games at middle linebacker. He registered 99 tackles (second on the team), 5 sacks (third on the team), 14 tackles for loss (led the team), 3 interceptions (2 returned for touchdowns) and 8 passes defensed (fourth on the team). He had 15 tackles (1.5 for loss) and 4 passes defensed against Western Illinois University. He made 13 tackles and 2 interceptions (one returned for a touchdown) against Morgan State University. He had 13 tackles (3 for loss), 2 sacks and 2 passes defensed against Norfolk State University. He received Defensive Player of the Year honors in the Mid-Eastern Athletic Conference (MEAC) and All-Eastern Region Team from the Don Hansen Gazette.

As a junior, he started 12 games at middle linebacker. He posted 124 tackles (led the team), 5 sacks (tied for the team lead), 15 tackles for loss (led the team and third in the conference), one interceptions, 2 passes defensed and 2 fumble recoveries. He had 7 contests with at least 10 tackles. He made 15 tackles (8 solo) and one interception in the 14-10 win over #19 ranked South Carolina State University. He finished third in the voting for the Buck Buchanan Award which recognizes the top defensive player in Division I-AA. Received MEAC Defensive Player of the Year and Associated Press All-American honors.

As a senior, he recorded 98 total tackles (led the conference), one sack, 13 tackles for loss (led the team), 5 passes defensed and one fumble recovery. He was part of a defense that allowed 14.5 points per game (7th in the NCAA). He became the first player in the history of the Mid-Eastern Athletic Conference to be named Defensive Player of the Year three times.

He finished his college career with 39 starts out of 43 games, while ranking second in school history with 353 career tackles and 176 solo tackles. He also totaled 10 sacks, three fumble recoveries, and four interceptions. He contributed to three straight MEAC championships (2004, 2005, 2006).

In 2015, he was inducted into the Mid-Eastern Athletic Conference (MEAC) Hall of Fame.

== Professional career ==
=== Jacksonville Jaguars ===
Durant was selected by the Jacksonville Jaguars in the second round (48th overall) of the 2007 NFL draft. As a rookie, he posted 71 tackles (fifth on the team), one sack, 3 tackles for loss, one interception and 5 special teams tackles. He had his first start against the Atlanta Falcons, making 6 tackles. He became the regular starter at weakside linebacker against the Buffalo Bills, after weakside linebacker suffered a season-ending injury, responding by making 11 tackles and one interception. He had 11 tackles against the Indianapolis Colts. He made 13 tackles against the Pittsburgh Steelers. He had 12 tackles and one sack against the Oakland Raiders. He made 17 tackles (second in team playoff history) in the wild card playoff game against the Pittsburgh Steelers. He had 14 tackles in the AFC divisional playoff game against the New England Patriots.

In 2008, he started 12 out of 14 games at weakside linebacker, missing 2 games with a groin injury. He totaled 113 tackles (third on the team), 7 tackles for loss (led the team), 6 passes defensed (second on the team), one quarterback pressure and 3 special teams tackles. He was named to the USA Today All-Joe Team. He had 10 tackles and one pass defensed against the Pittsburgh Steelers. He made 11 tackles against the Cleveland Browns. He had 12 tackles against the Detroit Lions. He made 14 tackles against the Baltimore Ravens.

In 2009, he was moved from outside linebacker to middle linebacker, where he started 13 games, missing 3 contests with a hip injury and a concussion. He posted 135 tackles (second on the team), one sack, 3 quarterback pressures, 4 tackles for loss, one interception and one forced fumble. He had 14 tackles in the season opener against the Indianapolis Colts. He made 15 tackles and one forced fumble against the Arizona Cardinals. He had 10 tackles against the Houston Texans. He made 17 tackles against the Tennessee Titans. He had 13 tackles against the Miami Dolphins.

In 2010, he started 9 out of 10 games at weakside linebacker, missing 6 contests with ankle and groin injuries. He registered 99 tackles (third on the team), 5 tackles for loss, 3 passes defensed and one fumble recovery. He had 11 tackles (one for loss) in the season opener against the Denver Broncos. He made 13 tackles (one for loss) against the Tennessee Titans. Even though he didn't start the game, he had 17 tackles (one for loss) against the Dallas Cowboys. He made 10 tackles against the Cleveland Browns. He missed the last 3 games of the season with a groin injury. In four seasons with the Jaguars, he recorded 272 tackles, two interceptions, and two sacks in 50 games.

=== Detroit Lions ===
On July 29, 2011, Durant signed as a free agent with the Detroit Lions. He started 12 out of 13 games at strongside linebacker, missing 3 contests with a concussion. He collected 68 tackles, one sack, one pass defensed and one forced fumble. He had 11 tackles against the Kansas City Chiefs. He made 7 tackles and one forced fumble against the Oakland Raiders. He had 11 tackles and one sack against the San Diego Chargers. He made 9 tackles in the wild card playoff game against the New Orleans Saints.

In 2012, he started 14 out of 16 games at strongside linebacker, tallying 103 tackles (second on the team), a half sack, 7 tackles for loss and 3 passes defensed. He had 12 tackles (one for loss) in the season opener against the St. Louis Rams. He made 8 tackles (one for loss) against the Philadelphia Eagles. He had 8 tackles (one for loss) and one pass defensed against the Houston Texans. In 2 seasons, he recorded 171 tackles and 1.5 sacks in 29 games played.

=== Dallas Cowboys (first stint) ===
On March 27, 2013, Durant signed a two-year, $1.96 million contract with the Dallas Cowboys, who were transitioning into a 4-3 defense. The deal included a $400,000 signing bonus. He was named the starter at strongside linebacker, but experienced an injury-filled season. He first suffered a groin injury against the San Diego Chargers, that caused him to miss a game. On November 10 against the New Orleans Saints he injured his hamstring, which cost him three games. He returned to face the Green Bay Packers but reinjured the hamstring. He was placed on the injured reserve list on December 17, after playing in 10 games (six starts) and finishing with 30 tackles (2 for loss), 2 quarterback pressures, a pass defensed, one forced fumble and a fumble recovery.

In 2014, after Sean Lee was lost for the season, the plan was for Durant to replace him at middle linebacker, until the Cowboys acquired Rolando McClain in a trade from the Baltimore Ravens. He was then moved to the weakside linebacker spot and his level of play earned him the defensive captain role. He was having arguably the best season of his career and was the team's leading tackler, until suffering a torn bicep in Week 8. He also missed two games with a groin injury. He was placed on the injured reserve list on October 29. He finished with 59 tackles (four for loss), four passes defensed, two quarterback hurries, an interception, two forced fumbles, and a fumble recovery.

=== Atlanta Falcons ===
On March 10, 2015, Durant was signed as a free agent by the Atlanta Falcons, with the intention of making him their starting strongside linebacker. He had injury problems in preseason with his foot. In October, he suffered a sprained elbow that forced him to miss three games. He finished with 82 tackles (second on the team) and three passes defensed. He was released by the team on February 8, 2016.

=== Dallas Cowboys (second stint) ===
Durant was considering retirement before being signed by the Dallas Cowboys to a one-year deal on July 18, 2016, to provide depth at linebacker for a suspended Rolando McClain and other injured players. He played mostly on passing downs. He had a key pass deflection to help preserve a win in the fourth quarter of the second game of the season against the Washington Redskins. He left the eleventh game with a hamstring injury. He returned to play in the thirteenth game against the New York Giants. He suffered an elbow injury against the Tampa Bay Buccaneers, that made the team decide to save him for the playoffs and declared him inactive for the last 2 games. He finished with 54 tackles (2 for loss), one sack, 2 quarterback pressures and 3 passes defensed.

On July 20, 2017, Durant re-signed with the Cowboys and was assigned to the non-football injury list, while recovering from elbow surgery. On August 14, he was activated to participate in training camp. He wasn't as effective as in his previous seasons, playing in 7 games with 3 starts in place of an injured Sean Lee. In weeks 7, 8 and 9, he was declared inactive after being limited with a groin injury. In week 13, he was declared inactive with a concussion. In weeks 14 and 15, he was declared out with an elbow injury. On December 26, he was released to make room to activate linebacker Tre'Von Johnson. He finished with 14 tackles (3 for loss).

== NFL career statistics ==
Year	Team	GP	Tackles				Fumbles			Interceptions			
Year	Team	GP	Cmb	Solo	Ast	Sck	FF	FR	Yds	Int	Yds	TD	PD
2007	JAX	13	49	40	9	1.0	0	0	0	1	2	0	2
2008	JAX	14	70	62	8	0.0	0	0	0	0	0	0	5
2009	JAX	13	98	81	17	1.0	1	0	0	1	27	0	2
2010	JAX	10	55	47	8	0.0	0	1	0	0	0	0	2
2011	DET	13	68	53	15	1.0	1	0	0	0	0	0	1
2012	DET	16	103	82	21	0.5	0	0	0	0	0	0	3
2013	DAL	10	24	14	10	0.0	1	1	5	0	0	0	1
2014	DAL	6	49	31	18	0.0	2	1	0	1	1	0	4
2015	ATL	13	82	57	25	0.0	1	0	0	0	0	0	3
2016	DAL	13	37	24	13	1.0	0	0	0	0	0	0	3
Career		121	635	491	144	4.5	6	3	5	3	30	0	26

== Personal life ==
Durant is the younger brother of former CFL quarterback Darian Durant.
