= Robert C. Wright (politician) =

American politician

Member of the Pennsylvania House of Representatives from the 159th district
- In office 1981–1992
- Preceded by: Arthur Earley
- Succeeded by: Thaddeus Kirkland

Personal details
- Born: November 5, 1944 Chester, Pennsylvania
- Died: February 22, 2014 (aged 69) Thornbury Township, Delaware County, Pennsylvania
- Party: Republican

Robert C. Wright (November 5, 1944 – February 22, 2014) was an American politician from Pennsylvania. He served as a Republican member of the Pennsylvania House of Representatives, 159th district from 1981 to 1992 and as a judge on the Delaware County Court of Common Pleas from 1992 to 2008.

== Early life and education ==
Wright was born in Chester, Pennsylvania to Mary Maloney Wright and the Honorable Robert A. Wright. He graduated from Chester High School in 1962.

Wright graduated with a Bachelor of Arts degree from George Washington University in 1966 and received his law degree from Villanova University School of Law in 1969.

== Career ==
From 1970 to 1991, Wright worked as an attorney in his father's practice and was a director on several boards including the Chester Water Authority and the Chester Boys and Girls Club. He also served as the Solicitor for the Chester Housing Authority and President of the Delaware County Republican Council.

=== Pennsylvania House of Representatives ===
Wright was elected to the Pennsylvania House of Representatives, 159th district on September 15, 1981 in a special election to serve the remainder of the 1981 term after Arthur Earley died of a heart attack. He served five consecutive terms and resigned from the House on January 5, 1992.

=== Delaware County Court of Common Pleas ===
Wright was elected to the Delaware County Court of Common Pleas in 1992 and served until he retired in 2008. Wright and his father Robert A. Wright were the first father and son to serve on that court at the same time.

In 2014, Wright died at age 69 of complications of amyotrophic lateral sclerosis. He also believed he had chronic Lyme disease, a condition not recognized by medical science. He is interred at Haven Memorial Cemetery in Chester, Pennsylvania.

== Personal life ==
Wright was married to Florence Wright and they had two children together. He was a member of the Tau Epsilon Phi fraternity at George Washington University.

Pennsylvania House of Representatives
Preceded by Arthur Earley	Member of the Pennsylvania House of Representatives from the 159th district 1981–1992	Succeeded by Thaddeus Kirkland
