= Brian Kirkland =

American politician (born 1981)

Brian Joseph Kirkland
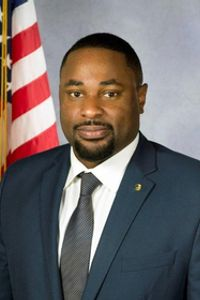

Member of the Pennsylvania House of Representatives from the 159th district
- In office January 3, 2017 – November 30, 2022
- Preceded by: Thaddeus Kirkland
- Succeeded by: Carol Kazeem

Personal details
- Born: January 22, 1981 (age 45)
- Party: Democratic
- Spouse: Shonse Hawkins
- Children: 1

Brian Joseph Kirkland (born January 22, 1981) is an American politician who served as a Democratic member of the Pennsylvania House of Representatives for the 159th district from 2017 to 2022.

== Early life and education ==
Kirkland graduated from Coatesville Area High School and attended East Stroudsburg University.

== Career ==
Kirkland served as Special Projects Coordinator for the city of Chester, Pennsylvania.

Kirkland served as Director of Constituent Services for his uncle, Thaddeus Kirkland, during his tenure as state representative to the Pennsylvania 159th district.

Kirkland was elected in 2016 as state representative to the Pennsylvania 159th district and replaced his uncle by defeating the Republican candidate Michael Ciach.

Kirkland served on the Committee On Committees, Gaming Oversight, Tourism & Recreational Development, and Urban Affairs committees.

Kirkland was defeated in the May 2022 Democratic primary by Carol Kazeem.

== Personal life ==
Kirkland lives in Chester, Pennsylvania and has a daughter.

Kirkland is a deacon at the Community Baptist Church in Chester, Pennsylvania where he runs a youth mentoring program.

Pennsylvania House of Representatives
| Preceded by Thaddeus Kirkland | Member of the Pennsylvania House of Representatives from the 159th district 2016–2022 | Succeeded by Carol Kazeem |
