= Carol Kazeem =

American politician

Member of the Pennsylvania House of Representatives from the 159th district
- Incumbent
- Assumed office January 3, 2023
- Preceded by: Brian Kirkland

Personal details
- Born: Chester, Pennsylvania, U.S.
- Party: Democratic
- Education: Ridley High School; Anthem College; Keiser University

Carol Kazeem is an American politician currently serving as a Democratic member of the Pennsylvania House of Representatives for the 159th district since January 2023.

== Early life and education ==
She was born in Chester, Pennsylvania, and attended Chester Upland School District until high school. She graduated from Ridley High School in 2010. She received an Associate degree as a medical coder from Anthem College in 2012 and graduated from Keiser University in 2021 as a paralegal. She worked in the healthcare field for over 13 years in several roles including as a trauma outreach specialist.

== Career ==
She defeated the incumbent Brian Kirkland in the May 2022 Democratic primary election and Republican candidate Ruth Moton in the 2022 Pennsylvania House of Representatives election. She was sworn in on January 3, 2023.

== Personal life ==
Kazeem is a Nigerian-American. She is married and the mother of three children.

Pennsylvania House of Representatives
Preceded by Brian Kirkland	Member of the Pennsylvania House of Representatives from the 159th district 2022-present	Incumbent
