= Pennsylvania House of Representatives, District 159 =

American legislative district

Pennsylvania's 159th State House of Representatives district
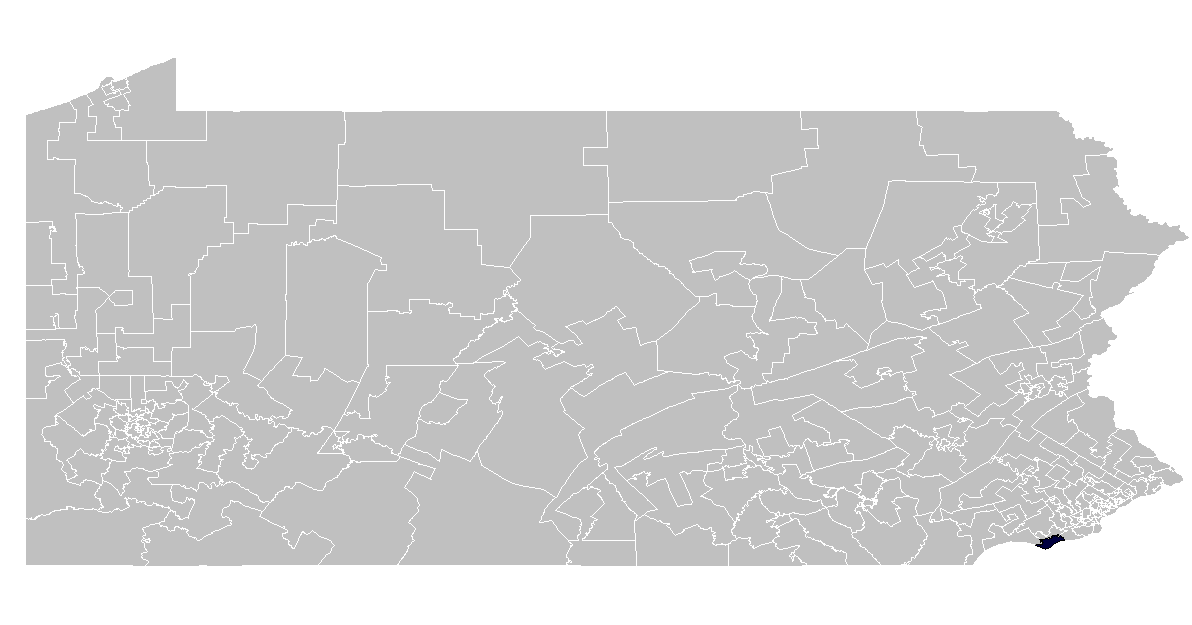
Representative
Carol Kazeem; D–Chester
- Demographics: 38.61% White; 54.57% Black; 6.70% Hispanic
- Population (2011) • Citizens of voting age: 60,270; 43,931

The 159th Pennsylvania House of Representatives District is located in Delaware County. The 159th District lies in the Southeast part of the state. It has been represented by Carol Kazeem since 2022.

== District profile ==
Delaware County, where the 159th district is located, is the fifth most populated county in the state. Chester of the 159th district is the oldest city in the state, being incorporated in 1682. The district includes the following areas:

- Chester
- Eddystone
- Lower Chichester Township
- Marcus Hook
- Parkside
- Trainer
- Upper Chichester Township

== Representatives ==
Representative	Party	Years	District home	Note
Prior to 1969, seats were apportioned by county.
Thomas H. Worrilow	Republican	1969 – 1976		
Francis X. Tenaglio	Democrat	1977 – 1978		
Arthur F. Earley	Republican	1979 – 1981		Died June 9, 1981
Robert C. Wright	Republican	1981 – 1992		Elected September 15, 1981 to fill vacancy Resigned January 6, 1992.
Thaddeus Kirkland	Democratic	1993 – 2016		
Brian Joseph Kirkland	Democratic	2017 – 2022		
Carol Kazeem	Democratic	2023 – present		Incumbent

== Recent election results ==
PA House election, 2010: Pennsylvania House, District 159
Party	Candidate	Votes	%	±%
Democratic	Thaddeus Kirkland	10,229	71.65%	
Republican	Rocky William Brown	4,047	38.35%	
Margin of victory		6,182	33.35%	
Turnout		14,276	100	

PA House election, 2012: Pennsylvania House, District 159
Party	Candidate	Votes	%	±%
Democratic	Thaddeus Kirkland	17,535	79.86%	
Republican	James Schiliro	4,435	20.19%	
Margin of victory		13,100	59.67%	▲26.32%
Turnout		21,970	100	

PA House election, 2014: Pennsylvania House, District 159
Party	Candidate	Votes	%	±%
Democratic	Thaddeus Kirkland	9,281	70.51%	
Republican	Michael J. Ciach	3,881	29.49%	
Margin of victory		5,400	41.02%	▼18.65%
Turnout		13,162	100	

PA House election, 2016: Pennsylvania House, District 159
Party	Candidate	Votes	%	±%
Democratic	Brian Joseph Kirkland	18,161	75.6%	
Republican	Michael J. Ciach	5,860	24.4%	
Margin of victory		12,301	51.2%	▲10.18%
Turnout		24,021	100	
