= Arthur Earley =

American politician

Arthur F. Earley

Member of the Pennsylvania House of Representatives from the 159th district
- In office 1979 – June 9, 1981
- Preceded by: Francis Tenaglio
- Succeeded by: Robert C. Wright

Personal details
- Born: September 4, 1925 Lynchburg, Virginia
- Died: June 9, 1981 (aged 55) Harrisburg, Pennsylvania
- Party: Republican
- Children: Claudia, Langston
- Occupation: Attorney, State Representative

Arthur Franklin Earley (September 4, 1925 – June 9, 1981) was an American politician who served as a Republican member of the Pennsylvania House of Representatives from the 159th district from 1979 to 1981. He was the first black member elected to the Pennsylvania House of Representatives from the 159th district. He was among the first African Americans to serve in the United States Marine Corps and was a founder of the Montford Point Marine Association.

== Early life and education ==
Earley was born in Lynchburg, Virginia. He received an A.B. from Howard University, attended American University and received an LL.B from Temple University Law School.

He served in World War II in the United States Marine Corps from 1943 to 1946.

In 1965, Earley was a legal advisor to the creation of the Montford Point Marine Association, a non-profit, military veteran organization founded to memorialize the legacy of the first African Americans to serve in the United States Marine Corps. Earley was accepted into the Montford Point Marine Association Hall of Fame posthumously in 1999.

== Career ==
Earley served as the assistant district attorney for Delaware County, Pennsylvania from 1971 to 1978. He was elected to the Pennsylvania House of Representatives from the 159th district for the 1979 and 1981 terms.

Earley was a member of the Delaware County bar association, Phi Beta Sigma fraternity, Phi Alpha Delta legal fraternity and the NAACP.

He died of a heart attack in office in 1981 and was succeeded by Robert C. Wright.

Pennsylvania House of Representatives
Preceded by Francis Tenaglio	Member of the Pennsylvania House of Representatives from the 159th district 1979–1981	Succeeded by Robert C. Wright
