= List of Atlanta Falcons head coaches =

The Atlanta Falcons are an American football team based in Atlanta, Georgia. They are members of the South division of the National Football Conference (NFC) in the National Football League (NFL). The Falcons joined the NFL as an expansion team in 1966, and have compiled an all-time record of 337 wins, 436 losses, and 6 ties. The team has won the NFC West championship twice in 1980 and 1998 and the NFC South championship 4 times in 2004, 2010, 2012 and 2016. The Falcons have appeared in two Super Bowls, losing both times; their first appearance was in Super Bowl XXXIII, with the Falcons falling to the Denver Broncos 19–34, and the second was in Super Bowl LI, where the Falcons fell to the New England Patriots 28–34 in overtime.

There have been 19 head coaches for the Falcons franchise, 14 serving full-time. Among full-time head coaches, Mike Smith is the Falcons' winningest and longest tenured head coach, with a 66–46 regular season record. Under Smith's leadership, the team attained consecutive winning seasons (11–5 in 2008 and 9–7 in 2009), consecutive playoff appearances (2010 and 2011), and consecutive seasons with 10 wins or more (also in 2010 and 2011) for the first time in franchise history. Also, Smith is the only Falcons coach to win 2 divisional titles (NFC South, 2010 and 2012). The current head coach of the Falcons is Kevin Stefanski.

== Key ==
#	Number of coaches (Note: A running total of the number of coaches of the Falcons. Thus, any coach who has two or more terms as head coach is only counted once.)
Yrs	Years coached
First	First season coached
Last	Last season coached
GC	Games Coached
W	Wins
L	Loses
T	Ties
Win%	Win – Loss percentage
‡	Elected into the Pro Football Hall of Fame as a player
*	Spent entire NFL head coaching career with the Falcons

== Coaches ==
Note: Statistics are correct as of end of the 2025 NFL season.

#	Image	Name	Term (Note: Each year is linked to an article about that particular NFL season.)			Regular season					Playoffs			Accomplishments	Ref.
#	Image	Name	Yrs	First	Last	GC	W	L	T	Win%	GC	W	L	Accomplishments	Ref.
1		Norb Hecker*	3	1966	1968 (Note: When Atlanta began the 1968 NFL season by dropping their first three games, Hecker was fired on October 1 and replaced by former Viking head coach Norm Van Brocklin.)	31	4	26	1	.133	—				
2		Norm Van Brocklin^{‡}	7	1968	1974 (Note: After winning just two of his first eight games in 1974, Van Brocklin was fired. He was replaced by defensive coordinator Campbell on an interim basis.)	89	37	49	3	.430	—				
3		Marion Campbell (Note: Marion Campbell's full coaching record with the Falcons is 68 regular season games coached with a record of 17–51 (.250))	3	1974	1976 (Note: After a 1-4 start to the season, head coach Marion Campbell was fired by general manager Pat Peppler, who himself would close out the season as the interim head coach and finish the season with a 3-6 record.)	25	6	19	0	.240	—				
4		Pat Peppler*	1	1976		9	3	6	0	.333	—				
5		Leeman Bennett	6	1977	1982	87	46	41	0	.529	4	1	3	1 NFC West Championship (1980); 3 Playoff Berths; 2 UPI NFL Coach of the Year Awards (1977, 1980)	
6		Dan Henning	4	1983	1986	64	22	41	1	.352	—				
–		Marion Campbell	3	1987	1989 (Note: Marion Campbell retired after the twelfth game of the season and replaced by offensive line coach, Jim Hanifan, on an interim basis.)	43	11	32	0	.256	—				
7		Jim Hanifan	1	1989		4	0	4	0	.000	—				
8		Jerry Glanville	4	1990	1993	64	27	37	0	.422	2	1	1	1 Playoff Berth	
9		June Jones	3	1994	1996	48	19	29	0	.396	1	0	1	1 Playoff Berth	
10		Dan Reeves	7	1997	2003 (Note: After losing seven straight games, Dan Reeves was let go by Falcons management, and Wade Phillps took over for the rest of the season.)	109	49	59	1	.454	5	3	2	1 NFC Championship (1998); 1 NFC South Championship (1998); 2 Playoff Berths; 1 AP NFL Coach of the Year Award (1998)	
11		Wade Phillips	1	2003		3	2	1	0	.667	—				
12		Jim L. Mora	3	2004	2006	48	26	22	0	.542	2	1	1	1 NFC South Championship (2004); 1 Playoff Berth	
13		Bobby Petrino*	1	2007 (Note: Petrino resigned just 13 games into the season to coach Arkansas. He was replaced by defensive backs coach Thomas on an interim basis.)		13	3	10	0	.231	—				
14		Emmitt Thomas* ^{‡}	1	2007		3	1	2	0	.333	—				
15		Mike Smith*	7	2008	2014	112	66	46	0	.589	5	1	4	2 NFC South Championships (2010, 2012); 4 Playoff Berths; 1 AP NFL Coach of the Year Award (2008)	
16		Dan Quinn	6	2015	2020 (Note: Quinn was fired after starting the season 0–5. He was replaced by defensive coordinator Morris on an interim basis.)	85	43	42	0	.506	5	3	2	1 NFC Championship (2016); 1 NFC South Championship (2016); 2 Playoff Berths	
17		Raheem Morris	1	2020		11	4	7	0	.364	—				
18		Arthur Smith*	3	2021	2023	51	21	30	0	.412	—				
–		Raheem Morris	2	2024	2025	34	16	18	0	.471	—				
19		Kevin Stefanski	1	2026	present	0	0	0	0	.000	—				
