= Patrick DiMarco =

American football player (born 1989)

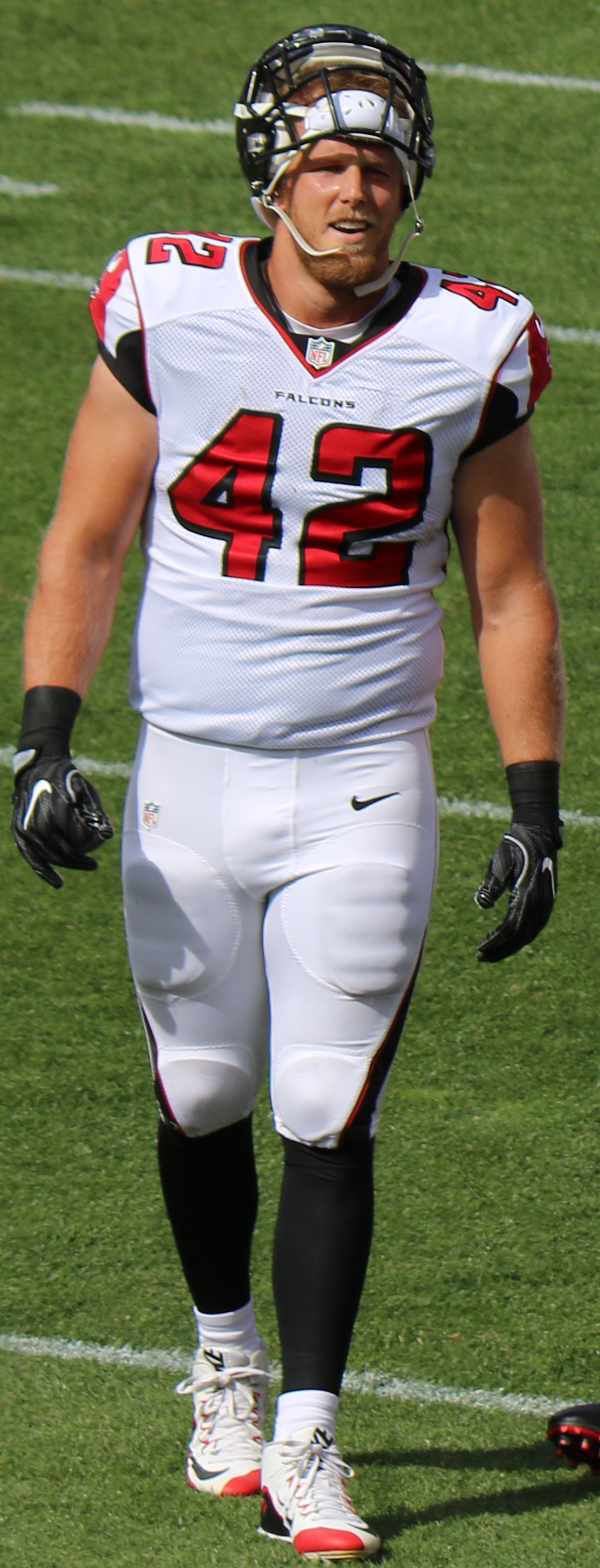
- DiMarco with the Atlanta Falcons in 2016

South Carolina Gamecocks
- Title: Analyst & assistant director of football relations

Personal information
- Born: April 30, 1989 (age 37); Altamonte Springs, Florida, U.S.
- Listed height: 6 ft 1 in (1.85 m)
- Listed weight: 234 lb (106 kg)

Career information
- High school: Lake Brantley (Altamonte Springs)
- College: South Carolina (2007–2010)
- NFL draft: 2011: undrafted

Career history

Playing
- San Diego Chargers (2011)*; Kansas City Chiefs (2012); Atlanta Falcons (2013–2016); Buffalo Bills (2017–2019)
- * Offseason or practice squad member only

Coaching
- South Carolina (2021–present) Analyst & assistant director of football relations

Awards and highlights
- Second-team All-Pro (2015); Pro Bowl (2015)

Career NFL statistics
- Rushing yards: 14
- Yards per carry: 2.0
- Receptions: 52
- Receiving yards: 404
- Receiving touchdowns: 4
- Stats at Pro Football Reference

Patrick Scott DiMarco (born April 30, 1989) is an American former professional football player who was a fullback in the National Football League (NFL). He played college football for the South Carolina Gamecocks and was signed by the San Diego Chargers as an undrafted free agent in 2011. He was also a member of the Kansas City Chiefs, Atlanta Falcons, and Buffalo Bills. DiMarco is currently an analyst on the football staff for the Gamecocks.

== Early life ==
DiMarco attended and played football at Lake Brantley High School in Altamonte Springs, Florida, where he played on both offense and defense. Rated a two-star recruit by Rivals.com and Scout.com, DiMarco was recruited by UCF, USF, Northwestern, Florida Atlantic, and South Carolina.

== College career ==
DiMarco played college football at South Carolina from 2007 to 2010 under coach Steve Spurrier. At South Carolina, DiMarco played tight end and fullback. In four seasons, he recorded 38 receptions for 302 yards and six touchdowns.

== Professional career ==
=== San Diego Chargers ===
DiMarco was signed by the San Diego Chargers as an undrafted free agent on July 26, 2011. He was released on August 7, 2011 after fracturing a bone in his foot.

=== Kansas City Chiefs ===
On August 2, 2012, DiMarco was signed by the Kansas City Chiefs. On May 2, 2013, the Chiefs released DiMarco.

=== Atlanta Falcons ===
On May 30, 2013, DiMarco was signed by the Atlanta Falcons. On February 24, 2015, he signed a two-year contract extension with the Falcons. In Week 5, against the New York Jets, he caught a 13-yard pass for his first career reception. In Week 4 of the 2014 season, he caught his first career touchdown pass in a 41–28 loss to the Minnesota Vikings. Leading into Week 4 of the 2015 NFL season, DiMarco was graded out as the best fullback in the NFL by Pro Football Focus (PFF) grading. In Week 11, against the Indianapolis Colts, he had three receptions for 21 yards and two touchdowns for his first career multi-touchdown game. DiMarco won the Falcons' Walter Payton Man of the Year Award nominee for the 2015 Season. PFF listed DiMarco as a First-team All-Pro fullback for 2015. In 2015, DiMarco was elected to his first Pro Bowl and was a second-team All-Pro. The Falcons would reach Super Bowl LI in the 2016 season. Against the New England Patriots, DiMarco had two receptions for 12 yards in the 34–28 overtime defeat.

=== Buffalo Bills ===
On March 9, 2017, DiMarco signed a four-year contract with the Buffalo Bills. In the 2017 season, DiMarco appeared in all 16 games and recorded nine starts to go along with seven receptions for 28 receiving yards. In the 2018 season, DiMarco appeared in all 16 games and recorded five starts to go along with three receptions for 62 receiving yards. In the 2019 season, DiMarco appeared in all 16 games and recorded four starts to go along with five receptions for 41 receiving yards.

On September 4, 2020, DiMarco was placed on injured reserve, and was released with an injury settlement four days later. On January 28, 2021, DiMarco announced his retirement from football.

== Post-playing career ==
DiMarco joined the staff at his alma mater South Carolina in 2021 as an analyst and assistant director of football relations.

== Personal life ==
DiMarco is the nephew of professional golfer Chris DiMarco.
