= Thomas Worrilow =

American politician

Thomas H. Worrilow

Member of the Pennsylvania House of Representatives from the 159th district
- In office 1967–1976
- Preceded by: District created
- Succeeded by: Francis Tenaglio

Member of the Pennsylvania House of Representatives from the Delaware County district
- In office 1963–1964
- Preceded by: John E. Gremminger
- Succeeded by: John E. Gremminger

Personal details
- Born: August 15, 1918 Chester, Pennsylvania, US
- Died: August 29, 2004 (aged 86) Chester, Pennsylvania, US
- Party: Republican

Thomas H. Worrilow (August 15, 1918 – August 29, 2004) was an American politician who served as a Republican member of the Pennsylvania House of Representatives for the Delaware County district from 1963 to 1964 and the 159th district from 1967 to 1976.

== Early life ==
Worrilow was born in Chester, Pennsylvania. He served as a sergeant in the United States Army Corps of Engineers during World War II from 1942 to 1945 and received 3 overseas service bars, the Good Conduct Medal, on service strip and the European-African-Middle East Campaign Medal and 3 Bronze Star Medals.

== Civilian career ==
Worrilow worked as a typesetter for the Delaware Valley Times for 45 years, an insurance agent, volunteer firefighter and President of Moyamensing Fire Company.

== Political career ==
Worrilow served as an alderman in Chester from 1960 to 1966. He was elected as a Republican to the Pennsylvania House of Representatives for the Delaware County district for the 1963 term. He was an unsuccessful candidate for reelection in 1964.

In 1967, Pennsylvania created the 159th district and Worrilow was elected as representative and served 4 terms afterwards. During his time as Pennsylvania State Representative, he lobbied for improvements to Pennsylvania Route 291. He was an unsuccessful candidate for reelection in 1976 and was succeeded by Francis Tenaglio.

Worrilow died in Chester, Pennsylvania.

Pennsylvania House of Representatives
Preceded by John E. Gremminger	Member of the Pennsylvania House of Representatives from the Delaware County district 1961–1963	Succeeded by John E. Gremminger
Preceded by District created	Member of the Pennsylvania House of Representatives from the 159th district 1967–1976	Succeeded by Francis Tenaglio
