= Paul Worrilow =

American football player (born 1990)

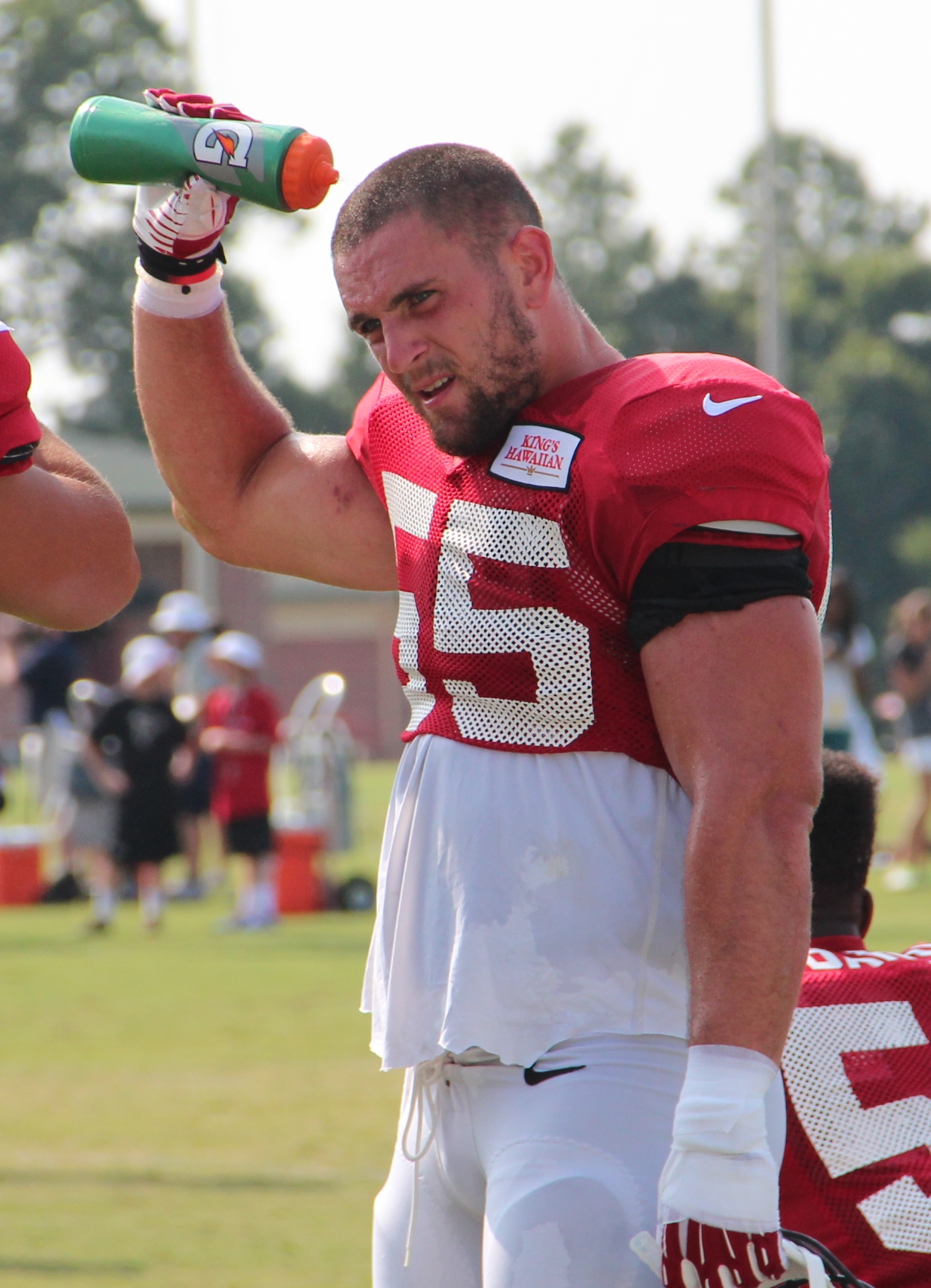
- Worrilow with the Atlanta Falcons in 2014

Cleveland Browns
- Title: Defensive quality control coach

Personal information
- Born: May 1, 1990 (age 36); Wilmington, Delaware, U.S.
- Listed height: 6 ft 0 in (1.83 m)
- Listed weight: 230 lb (104 kg)

Career information
- Position: Linebacker
- High school: Concord (Wilmington, Delaware)
- College: Delaware
- NFL draft: 2013: undrafted

Career history

Playing
- Atlanta Falcons (2013–2016); Detroit Lions (2017); Philadelphia Eagles (2018); Baltimore Ravens (2019)*; New York Jets (2019–2020)
- * Offseason or practice squad member only

Coaching
- Cleveland Browns (2026–present) Defensive quality control coach

Awards and highlights
- FCS All-American (2012)

Career NFL statistics
- Total tackles: 415
- Sacks: 4
- Forced fumbles: 3
- Fumble recoveries: 4
- Interceptions: 2
- Stats at Pro Football Reference

Paul Eric Worrilow (/ˈwɔːrloʊ/; born May 1, 1990) is an American former professional football player who was a linebacker in the National Football League (NFL). He played college football for the Delaware Fightin' Blue Hens where he was recognized as an All-American, and became one of the program's most decorated athletes. The Atlanta Falcons signed him as an undrafted free agent following the 2013 NFL draft.

== Early life ==
Worrilow is the second youngest of four boys. His mother was born in Wallingford, Connecticut and his father was born in Chester, Pennsylvania.

== College career ==
Worrilow was not highly recruited after graduation and was only able to solidify offers from Division II schools. Instead of taking any offers, Worrilow moved to Coffeyville, Kansas, where he attended Coffeyville Community College, a junior college known for funneling athletes into Division I football programs. Worrilow was redshirted his first year due to a defensive scheme change, and ultimately turned down interest from the Arkansas Razorbacks to return to Delaware in the spring of 2008 and walk on the Blue Hens football squad.

Worrilow immediately drew attention during his first spring at the University of Delaware, earning a starting spot the following fall as a redshirt freshman along with a team scholarship as a walk-on. Starting every game he played, Worrilow would eventually become team co-captain as a junior, and remain as captain through his senior year, racking up a University of Delaware fifth all-time high 377 career tackles and earning a spot on both the Phil Steele and Sports Network All-American teams. Additionally, Worrilow earned the MVP award for the 2012 season and the prestigious 2013 Edgar Johnson award for exhibiting qualities of hard work, dedication, leadership, fairness, and striving for excellence.

Notable performances include two-time consecutive fumble recoveries for touchdowns (a current Delaware record), a career-record 18 tackles in the Route 1 Rivalry game against Delaware State, which earned him the College Sports Madness CAA Defensive Player of the Week, Beyond Sports Network Defensive All-Star and the Nate Beasley Game MVP Award, and a 38-stop run through the four-game 2010 FCS playoffs, leading the Blue Hens to the 2010 NCAA Division I Football Championship in Frisco, Texas, where they lost 20–19 in a match to Eastern Washington.

=== College awards and honors ===
Worrilow at Delaware in 2012

- 2013 Edgar Johnson Award Winner
- 2012 University of Delaware Football Season MVP
- 3rd team The Sports Network All-American
- 1st team All-Colonial Athletic Association
- Honorable Mention, College Sports Journal All-American
- 1st team All-ECAC (All-East)
- Colonial Athletic Association Defensive Player of the Week (Sept. 9; Sept. 23)
- Beyond Sports Network Defensive All-Star (Delaware State)
- Colonial Athletic Association Chuck Boone Leadership Award Nominee
- Nate Beasley Game MVP Award (Delaware State)
- Blue Hen Touchdown Club Outstanding Senior on Defense Award
- Blue Hen Touchdown Club Captain's Award
- Blue Hen Touchdown Club Baker Taylor Award
- College Sports Madness CAA Defensive Player of the Week (Delaware State)
- Texas vs The Nation All-Star Game Participant

== Professional career ==
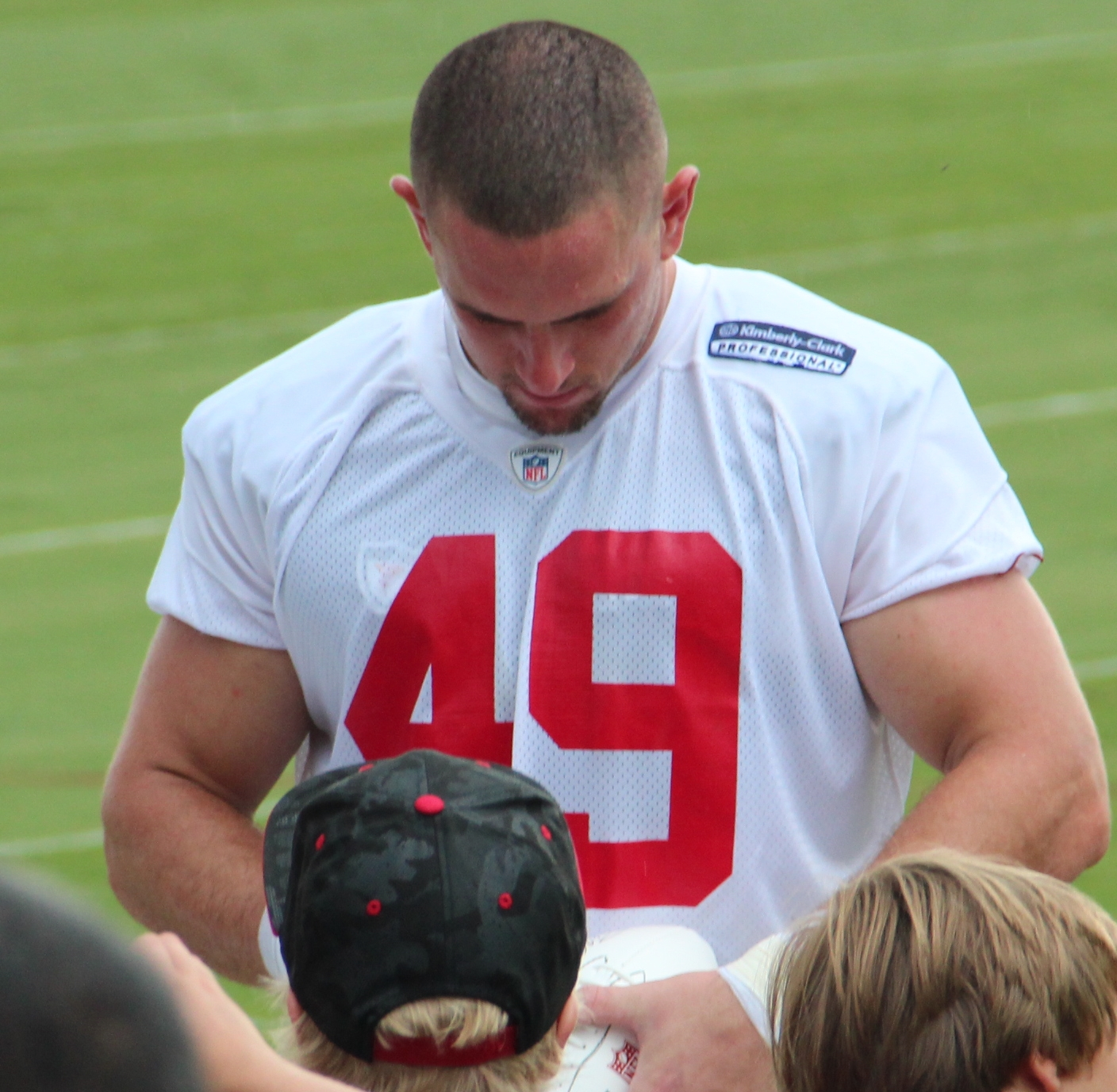
Worrilow with the Falcons in 2013

Pre-draft measurables
Height	Weight	Arm length	Hand span	Wingspan	40-yard dash	10-yard split	20-yard split	20-yard shuttle	Three-cone drill	Vertical jump	Broad jump	Bench press
6 ft 2 in (1.88 m)	238 lb (108 kg)	30 1/8 in (0.77 m)	9 1/8 in (0.23 m)	6 ft 2 1/4 in (1.89 m)	4.59 s	1.57 s	2.59 s	3.97 s	6.50 s	34.5 in (0.88 m)	10 ft 4 in (3.15 m)	30 reps
All values from Pro Day

=== Atlanta Falcons ===
Worrilow was signed as a free agent after the 2013 NFL draft by the Atlanta Falcons eventually making the final 53-man roster for the 2013 season. After spending a few weeks as the team's backup middle linebacker, Worrilow moved into the starting strongside linebacker position. On a November 3, 2013, loss against the Carolina Panthers, Worrilow recorded a career-high 19 tackles, tying his previous week's performance and a franchise record for most tackles in a game since 1994.

Worrilow ended the 2013 NFL season as the Falcons' leading tackler, landing him a spot on Mel Kiper, Jr.'s All-Rookie Team alongside teammate and fellow rookie Desmond Trufant.

Worrilow ended the 2014 NFL season again leading the Falcons in tackles at 143 tackles (84 solo), two sacks, two forced fumbles, three passes deflected.

In February 2014, Worrilow received the John J. Brady Delaware Athlete of the Year Award from the Delaware Sportswriters and Broadcasters Association.

Worrilow ended the 2015 NFL season again leading the Falcons in tackles at 95 tackles (67 solo), one forced fumble, one fumble recovery, two interceptions, four passes deflected.

In the 2016 season, Worrilow and the Falcons reached Super Bowl LI, where they faced the New England Patriots on February 5, 2017. In the Super Bowl, the Falcons fell in a 34–28 overtime defeat.

=== Detroit Lions ===
On March 10, 2017, Worrilow signed with the Detroit Lions. Worrilow recovered a muffed punt in a Week 17 matchup against the Green Bay Packers.

=== Philadelphia Eagles ===
On April 3, 2018, Worrilow signed with the Philadelphia Eagles. On May 22, 2018, Worrilow tore his ACL on the first day of OTAs, ending his season. He was officially placed on injured reserve on June 13, 2018.

On January 30, 2019, Worrilow signed a one-year contract extension with the Eagles. He was released by the Eagles on August 18, 2019.

=== Baltimore Ravens ===
Worrilow signed with the Baltimore Ravens on August 23, 2019. He requested his release from the team the next day to decide his future in the NFL. Worrilow worked out for the Eagles on September 10 and October 8, and for the New York Jets on November 1.

=== New York Jets ===
On November 5, 2019, Worrilow was signed by the New York Jets.

On September 16, 2020, Worrilow was signed to the Jets' practice squad, but was released on September 22, he then retired from his professional playing career.

== NFL career statistics ==
Legend
**Bold**	Career high

=== Regular season ===
Year	Team	Games		Tackles					Interceptions					Fumbles			
Year	Team	GP	GS	Cmb	Solo	Ast	Sck	TFL	Int	Yds	TD	Lng	PD	FF	FR	Yds	TD
2013	ATL	**16**	12	127	79	48	**2.0**	4	0	0	0	0	1	0	0	0	0
2014	ATL	**16**	**16**	**142**	**84**	**58**	**2.0**	4	0	0	0	0	3	**2**	0	0	0
2015	ATL	15	15	95	67	28	0.0	**5**	**2**	**22**	0	**11**	**4**	1	1	0	0
2016	ATL	12	1	21	14	7	0.0	1	0	0	0	0	2	0	**2**	0	0
2017	DET	13	8	30	20	10	0.0	1	0	0	0	0	1	0	1	0	0
2019	NYJ	4	0	0	0	0	0.0	0	0	0	0	0	0	0	0	0	0
		76	52	415	264	151	4.0	15	2	22	0	11	11	3	4	0	0

=== Playoffs ===
Year	Team	Games		Tackles					Interceptions					Fumbles			
Year	Team	GP	GS	Cmb	Solo	Ast	Sck	TFL	Int	Yds	TD	Lng	PD	FF	FR	Yds	TD
2016	ATL	**3**	0	**3**	**2**	**1**	0.0	0	0	0	0	0	0	0	0	0	0
		3	0	3	2	1	0.0	0	0	0	0	0	0	0	0	0	0

== Coaching career ==
On March 28, 2026, the Cleveland Browns hired Worrilow to serve as a defensive quality control coach.

== Other ==
He was inducted into the Delaware Sports Hall of Fame in 2023.

== Personal life ==
His oldest brother Edward, a marketing professional and accomplished pianist, also graduated from the University of Delaware. His older brother Mark played in the Aztec Bowl in 2009 and was captain of the Division III Ursinus Bears football team, where his younger brother James also competed as a defensive lineman. Worrilow trained throughout his childhood at the Stay Real Football Camp in Wilmington, Delaware. Worrilow attended Concord High School in Wilmington, Delaware where he led the Concord Raiders to the 2006 state Division II title and a berth in the state semifinals in 2005 and 2007. Worrilow made the 2006 First Team All-State on both offense and defense, the 2007 second team All-State as Fullback and first team All-State, and was named Delaware's "2007 Defensive Player of the Year". Despite Worrilow's great success in high school, he was not offered a single scholarship to play NCAA Division I football.

In the spring of 2011, Worrilow discovered he had been matched to a 23-year-old female leukemia patient in need of a life-saving peripheral blood stem cell donation. Worrilow had two-years-prior signed up for the National Marrow Donor Program, through which the chances of becoming a donor are 2/10ths of 1 percent. In the five days leading up to the procedure, Worrilow underwent a series of injections of a drug called filgrastim to increase the number of blood-forming cells in his bloodstream. On May 25, 2011, over the course of 6 hours, Worrilow's blood was then removed through a needle in one arm and passed through a machine that separates out the blood-forming cells, returning it back through a vein in his other arm. Worrilow has yet to meet the woman who received his donation.

On July 5, 2014, Worrilow married his longtime girlfriend. They had their first child together in May 2015.
