= Chester school protests =

1964 civil rights protests in the United States

- Part of the Civil Rights Movement
- Date: November 4, 1963 – April 28, 1964
- Location: Chester, Pennsylvania
- Caused by: Racial segregation of Chester public schools
- Result: Pennsylvania State Human Relations Commission determined the Chester School Board had broken the law; Chester School Board was ordered to desegregate Chester schools; Formation of the Greater Chester Movement (GCM) which became a conduit for distribution of funding for President Lyndon Johnson's War on Poverty

Parties
Committee for Freedom Now (CFFN); Congress of Racial Equality (CORE); NAACP; Students from: Cheyney State College; Pennsylvania Military College; Swarthmore College chapter of Students for a Democratic Society	Chester, Pennsylvania; Chester Parents Association; Chester Police Department; Chester School Board; State of Pennsylvania; Pennsylvania State Human Relations Committee; Pennsylvania State Police

Lead figures
CFFN member Stanley Branche; NAACP member George Raymond	Mayor of Chester James Gorbey; Governor of Pennsylvania William Scranton

The Chester school protests were a series of demonstrations that occurred from November 1963 through April 1964 in Chester, Pennsylvania. The demonstrations aimed to end the de facto segregation of Chester public schools that persisted after the 1954 Supreme Court case Brown v. The Board of Education of Topeka. The racial unrest and civil rights protests were led by Stanley Branche of the Committee for Freedom Now (CFFN) and George Raymond of the National Association for the Advancement of Colored Persons (NAACP).

The protests intensified from February to April 1964, featuring civil rights rallies, marches, pickets, boycotts, and sit-ins. More than 600 people were arrested. National civil rights leaders such as Dick Gregory, Gloria Richardson, and Malcolm X came to Chester to support the demonstrations.

In April 1964, almost nightly protests brought chaos to Chester. The city deputized firemen and trash collectors to help handle demonstrators and the State of Pennsylvania deployed 50 state troopers to assist the 77-member Chester police force. The demonstrations were marked by violence and police brutality; activist James Farmer dubbed Chester the "Birmingham of the North".

The protests came to an end on April 26, when Pennsylvania Governor William Scranton convinced protestors to obey a court-ordered moratorium on demonstrations by forming the Pennsylvania Human Relations Committee to hold hearings on school desegregation.

In November 1964, the committee concluded that the Chester School Board had violated the law. The Chester School District was ordered to desegregate the city's six predominantly African-American schools. The city appealed the ruling, which delayed implementation, but eventually desegregated the schools.

== Contributing factors ==
=== Economic disparity ===
As manufacturing in Chester declined during the 1950s and 1960s, most of Chester's labor force worked in low-paying service positions or industrial work. White and educated residents of Chester fled to suburban Delaware County to pursue better jobs and housing as more black residents moved into Chester. From 1950 to 1960, the white population decreased by 19% and the black population increased by 53%. The white exodus fortified residential segregation, until 80% of the black population lived in a cluster of census tracts in central Chester. White families that remained in Chester had a higher average income than black families: the median income for white families was $5,880 and the median income for black families $4,059. Black families constituted half of the impoverished population in Chester; white families, 25%.

=== Poor schools ===
Majority-black schools suffered from low funding and overcrowding. The buildings were generally old and made of weakening wood and plaster, with inadequate heating and bathrooms. Classrooms were small and stocked with secondhand books. Franklin Elementary School was a prime example of decrepit school conditions; the facility was constructed in 1910 for 50 students, but over fifty years later in 1963 it served over 1,000 students, almost all black. The library at Franklin Elementary was merely a few piles of books, the gym an empty coal bin, and the playground a cement area with a dangerous 4-foot drop on one side. The school's average class size was 39, twice that of nearby all-white schools. The school had just two bathrooms.

=== Earlier desegregation efforts ===
George Raymond became the leader of the Chester branch of the NAACP in 1942 and began to implement programs to end racial discrimination. He worked with J. Pius Barbour, the pastor of Calvary Baptist Church in Chester, to adopt a gradualist approach to civil rights.

In 1945, Raymond and the NAACP desegregated movie theaters, restaurants, hotels, and other businesses in Chester through non-violent protests and the threat of legal action.

In 1946, a student strike organized by the NAACP and a committee of black parents led the school board to formally consent to integrating Chester's public schools. But more than two decades would pass before this seeming victory produced real change. White parents did their best to inhibit integration, and many moved their children to predominantly white schools. After the 1954 Brown decision, the school board created "neighborhood schools" that purported to eschew racial discrimination, but which reflected the surrounding residentially segregated neighborhoods. Just one of Chester's 16 public schools was substantially racially integrated. When local church and civil rights leaders confronted the school board about the de facto segregation, the school board acknowledged the lack of integration but blamed it on residential issues over which they had no control.

Stanley Branche arrived back home in Chester in 1962 after participating in activism in the Cambridge movement in Dorchester County, Maryland. Branche recognized the dire circumstances of the Chester school system, especially Franklin Elementary School, and created the Committee for Freedom Now (CFFN) in Chester along with the Swarthmore College chapter of Students for a Democratic Society and disgruntled parents. Branche became frustrated with the gradualist approach taken by Raymond and the NAACP and proposed more militant protest techniques.

== Timeline ==
=== Fall 1963 ===
Substantial activism concerning school conditions took about a year to incubate in Chester after the establishment of the CFFN. On November 4, 1963, 20 protesters formed a picket line outside Franklin Elementary; 130 more joined them within two days. The day after a mass meeting of community members on November 11, 400 people blocked the doors to Franklin Elementary School, which forced the cancellation of school for the day by early morning. After closing the school, protesters marched to the Mayor's chambers and the Board of Education.

Protests outside of Franklin Elementary continued on November 13 and 14. Some participants lay down in front of the doors. On the morning of November 14, 83 protesters were arrested. Later that day, 50 state troopers arrived to assist the 77-member Chester police force. After media coverage of the mass arrests drew public attention, the mayor and school board negotiated with the CFFN and NAACP. The Chester Board of Education agreed to reduce class sizes at Franklin school, remove unsanitary toilet facilities, move classes held in the boiler room and coal bin, and repair school grounds. On the evening of November 14, the school board agreed to repair schools and reduce overcrowding by transferring 173 students from Franklin Elementary School. Still, the following day, hundreds of demonstrators crowded the doors of the school.

=== Spring 1964 ===
Protests relented for a couple of months while the CFFN established a better structure and added goals to the organization's agenda, including improving more Chester public schools, increasing the availability of jobs, improving housing and medical care, and generally ending discrimination.

Protests resumed on February 10, 1964, after the CFFN planned a boycott of Chester's public schools to begin the next day. The boycott drove absentee rates in some majority black-attended schools up to 55%.

The "Freedom Now Conference" was held in Chester on March 14, 1964. More than 60 delegates and visitors from eight states attended the conference, including Dick Gregory, Gloria Richardson, and Malcolm X. During the conference, some 200 protesters from the CFFN marched to present demands to the mayor.

On March 27, 1964, 300 protestors marched from the West End of Chester to the downtown business district, escorted by the entire Chester police force. On March 28, some 200 protestors staged midday sit-down demonstrations at key intersections to disrupt downtown traffic. The protest was met by a violent police response with officers "swinging riot sticks" and arresting all protestors.

The violent response by Chester police resulted in even larger demonstrations with ordinary citizens outraged by the images of peaceful protestors being dragged and beaten by police. Branche called for massive civil disobedience in response to the police violence and the nightly standoffs between protestors and police overshadowed the original intent of the protests.

The height of the Chester School Protests occurred in April 1964. On April 2, Branche led 350 protestors in front of the police headquarters. On April 3, the mayor of Chester, James Gorbey, issued "The Police Position to Preserve the Public Peace", a 10-point statement promising an immediate return to law and order. The city deputized firemen and trash collectors to help handle demonstrators. The State of Pennsylvania deployed 50 state troopers to assist the 77-member Chester police force.

On April 20, The CFFN, the NAACP, and the Chester School Board met to discuss the legal charges brought against protesters who were arrested. Raymond presented the school board with a list of 10 demands including teacher transfers, transportation of students to schools in other neighborhoods, hiring blacks for supervisory positions and hiring more black secretaries. The next day, April 21, the Pennsylvania Human Relations Commission admitted that it failed to bring the civil rights groups and the school board to a compromise. The school board closed all Chester public schools indefinitely on April 22, claiming the purpose of the closures was to prevent violence. That night, 300 protesters rallied at the police station; after they refused to disperse, some were violently beaten by 40 Chester police officers. On April 23, another protest at the police station devolved into a rock-throwing melee that hospitalized six police officers and eight protestors. Demonstrators held a rally against police brutality and linked arms to block a downtown intersection on April 24, which also ended in police violence. On April 25, James Farmer dubbed Chester the "Birmingham of the North," in reference to the harsh treatment of protesters in Birmingham, Alabama around the same time.

Some of the white residents of Chester created the Chester Parents Association as a counter response that aimed to keep the neighborhood schools policy. The group held a rally of 2,000 people on April 26, 1964.

On April 26, Governor William Scranton convinced Branche to obey a court-ordered moratorium on demonstrations. Scranton created the Pennsylvania Human Relations Commission to conduct hearings on the de facto segregation of public schools. All protests were discontinued while the commission held hearings during the summer of 1964.

Judge John V. Diggins granted the requests of the Chester School Board on April 28 to place an injunction that would prohibit demonstrators from protesting on or near public school property, allowing the schools to reopen. Over 600 people were arrested over a two-month period of civil rights rallies, marches, pickets, boycotts and sit-ins.

=== Aftermath ===
On May 4, 1964, the Pennsylvania Human Relations Commission began hearings to determine the state of de facto segregation in Chester. The hearings included testimonies from multiple civil rights leaders in the area, including a testimony from Branche, a testimony from the school board president, Frances Donahoo, and reports from Commission investigators. The Commission finally released its verdict in November 1964, saying Chester public schools "had committed and continues to commit unlawful discrimination practices in violation of the Pennsylvania Human Relations Act" and requiring the city to develop a desegregation plan for six predominantly African-American schools by January 31, 1965. The city appealed the ruling, delaying its implementation.

In June 1964, Chester city leaders formed the Greater Chester Movement (GCM), an umbrella organization intended to coordinate activities of groups working toward the improvement of Chester. When President Lyndon B. Johnson initiated his War on Poverty, the GCM became a conduit through which federal dollars were distributed in Chester with Branche serving on the steering committee.

The Pennsylvania Commonwealth Court ruled on February 15, 1966, that the Pennsylvania Human Relations Commission did not have the authority to force Chester schools to integrate. In response, the CFFN, NAACP, and Congress of Racial Equality (CORE) announced new demonstrations. Branche attempted to reinstate another school boycott beginning on April 1, 1966, but most students ignored the boycott.

Over a year later, on September 26, 1967, the Pennsylvania Supreme Court ruled to reinstate the authority of the Pennsylvania Human Relations Commission. Following this decision, the Chester School Board voted to "eliminate or substantially reduce" the de facto segregation at six schools on October 2, 1967. Charges against protesters who were arrested in the boycotts and demonstrations were not thrown out until 1971.

== See also ==
- Timeline of the civil rights movement
- List of incidents of civil unrest in the United States
