= James Henry Gorbey =

American judge (1920–1977)

Judge of the United States District Court for the Eastern District of Pennsylvania
- In office December 21, 1970 – October 24, 1977
- Appointed by: Richard Nixon
- Preceded by: Seat established by 84 Stat. 294
- Succeeded by: Norma Levy Shapiro

Mayor of Chester, Pennsylvania
- In office 1964–1967
- Preceded by: Joseph L. Eyre
- Succeeded by: John H. Nacrelli

Chester City Council
- In office 1956–1963

Personal details
- Born: July 30, 1920 Chester, Pennsylvania, US
- Died: October 24, 1977 (aged 57)
- Party: Republican
- Education: Bowling Green State University (B.A.); Temple University Beasley School of Law (LL.B.)

James Henry Gorbey (July 30, 1920 – October 24, 1977) was an American politician and judge from Pennsylvania. He was a Republican member of the Chester City Council from 1956 to 1963 and served as mayor of Chester, Pennsylvania, from 1964 to 1967 during the Chester school protests. Gorbey was a judge of the Delaware County Court of Common Pleas from 1968 to 1970 and a United States district judge of the United States District Court for the Eastern District of Pennsylvania from 1970 to 1977.

== Early life and education ==
Gorbey was born on July 30, 1920, in Chester, Pennsylvania. He served as a lieutenant in the United States Marine Corps during World War II from 1942 to 1945. He received a Bachelor of Arts degree from Bowling Green State University in 1945 and a Bachelor of Laws from Temple University Beasley School of Law in 1949.

== Career ==
Gorbey was in private law practice in Chester from 1949 to 1967.

In 1950, he served as an investigator and appraiser for the Commonwealth of Pennsylvania Inheritance Tax Department. From 1951 to 1952, he was an editor of the Delaware County Legal Journal. From 1956 to 1963, he served as a member of the Chester City Council.

In January 1964, Gorbey became mayor of Chester at a time of racial strife and the Chester school protests of the city's segregated schools. During his inauguration speech, Gorbey said, "Chester has no Negro problem...and demonstrations will no longer be tolerated."

In spring 1964, almost-nightly protests led by George Raymond of the Chester branch of the NAACP and Stanley Branche of the Committee for Freedom Now (CFFN) brought chaos to Chester and resulted in mass arrests of protesters. Mayor Gorbey issued "The Police Position to Preserve the Public Peace", a ten-point statement promising an immediate return to law and order. The city deputized firemen and trash collectors to help handle demonstrators. The state of Pennsylvania sent 50 state troopers to help the 77-member Chester police force. The demonstrations were marked by violence and police brutality. Over 600 people were arrested during two months of civil rights rallies, marches, pickets, boycotts and sit-ins. The protests ended in November 1964, when the Pennsylvania Human Relations Commission ordered the desegregation of Chester public schools.

Gorbey was a judge of the Delaware County Court of Common Pleas from 1968 to 1970.

Gorbey was nominated by President Richard Nixon on November 30, 1970, to the United States District Court for the Eastern District of Pennsylvania, to a new seat created by 84 Stat. 294. He was confirmed by the United States Senate on December 19, 1970, and received his commission on December 21, 1970.

== Death ==
He died in office on October 24, 1977, and was interred at the Calvary Cemetery in West Conshohocken, Pennsylvania.

== See also ==
- List of mayors of Chester, Pennsylvania

Political offices
Preceded by Joseph L. Eyres	Mayor of Chester; 1964–1967	Succeeded by John H. Nacrelli
Legal offices
Preceded by Seat established by 84 Stat. 294	Judge of the United States District Court for the Eastern District of Pennsylvania; 1970–1977	Succeeded by Norma Levy Shapiro
