= John H. Nacrelli =

American politician

Mayor of Chester, Pennsylvania
- In office 1968–1979
- Preceded by: James Henry Gorbey
- Succeeded by: Joseph F. Battle Jr.

Chester City Council
- In office 1966–1968

Personal details
- Party: Republican

John H. Nacrelli, also known as Jack Nacrelli, was an American politician who served as a Republican mayor of Chester, Pennsylvania, from 1968 to 1979. Nacrelli was convicted on federal bribery and racketeering charges related to his activities as mayor and served two years in prison.

== Career ==
Nacrelli was appointed to the Chester City Council in 1966 to fill the vacancy caused by the death of Garry E. Boden. He was elected for a two-year term on the council in 1967.

Nacrelli was elected mayor of Chester in 1968 and served until 1979.

== Corruption ==
Nacrelli was affiliated with an illegal numbers gambling operation of the Miller-Fontaine syndicate. He accepted bribes to protect the numbers racket and directed the Chester Police Department to arrest numbers operators who tried to compete with the Miller-Fontaine operation.

The corrupt political system set up by Nacrelli stretched beyond Chester and into Delaware County.

Nacrelli was convicted of racketeering and income tax evasion for accepting $22,000 in bribes associated with the illegal gambling operation. He served two years in federal prison and returned to Chester in March 1982.

A few months after his release from prison, Nacrelli began working as a sales representative for JP Amusement, an illegal video poker machine business operated by Willie Smith, a known loan shark and narcotics financier and Joseph and James Iacona - the brothers of Gary Iacona, who was indicted for his involvement in the Philadelphia crime family capo Santo Idone. According to testimony at the 1989 Pennsylvania Crime Commission, Nacrelli would intimidate tavern owners to remove competitive video poker machines from their establishments and replace them with JP Amusement machines.

Nacrelli continued to play a role in local politics and Chester city government after his release from prison. He retained influence in the control of patronage matters and the official affairs of the Chester City Council and the Chester School District.

Nacrelli was hired by Westinghouse to influence Delaware County politicians into supporting the development of the Westinghouse trash incinerator in Chester despite the objections of Willie Mae James Leake, the mayor at the time. On October 25, 1988, Chester City Council signed an agreement to build the Westinghouse trash incinerator in Chester with Mayor Leake abstaining.

== Personal life ==
Nacrelli was married to Doris (Casey) Nacrelli and together had a son John H., Jr. born in 1951.

== See also ==
- List of mayors of Chester, Pennsylvania

Political offices
Preceded by James Henry Gorbey	Mayor of Chester; 1968–1979	Succeeded by Joseph F. Battle Jr.
