= CSMI =

US for-profit charter school operator

Coordinates: 39.848092°N 75.359852°W

CSMI is a for-profit charter school operator in Chester, Pennsylvania, in the United States. It operates Chester Community Charter School in the Chester Upland School District and a school in New Jersey. CSMI is led by Vahan H. Gureghian. In August 2020, the Washington Post published an article criticizing the administrative costs and educational outcomes achieved by CSMI as it was poised to take over the school district. It also operates Atlantic Community Charter School in Galloway Township, New Jersey. Top achieving students at the school were rewarded with a shopping spree. A school it managed in Camden, New Jersey, was closed for poor performance.

In 2019 it sought to take over the Chester School District but a judge rejected the plan.

Chester Community Charter School hosted a food bank in April 2021. Gureghian and CSMI have also helped fund laptop computers for students and scholarships to fund students who go on to attend private high schools.

On March 31, 2025, 20 employees of the school were charged with child abuse.
