= Willie Mae Leake =

American politician (1932–1997)

Willie Mae James Leake

Mayor of Chester, Pennsylvania
- In office 1986–1991
- Preceded by: Joseph F. Battle Jr.
- Succeeded by: Barbara Bohannan-Sheppard

Chester City Council
- In office 1984–1986

Personal details
- Born: March 13, 1932 Philadelphia, Pennsylvania, U.S.
- Died: August 28, 1997 (aged 65) Chester, Pennsylvania, U.S.
- Resting place: Haven Cemetery, Aston Township, Pennsylvania, U.S.
- Party: Republican

Willie Mae James Leake (March 13, 1932 – August 28, 1997) was an American politician from Pennsylvania who served as Republican mayor of Chester, Pennsylvania, from 1986 to 1991. Leake was the first female and first African-American mayor of Chester and the first female member of the Chester city council.

== Early life and education ==
Born in Philadelphia, Pennsylvania, she graduated with honors from Simon Gratz High School in 1950, and from the Eckles College of Mortuary Science in 1952.

== Career ==
Leake moved to Chester in 1951 and began working for the Lewis M. Hunt Funeral Home. In 1959, she opened her own business, the W.M. Leake Funeral Home, at Third and Broomall Streets in Chester. In May 1972, she moved the business to 10th and Pusey Street in Chester. The funeral home was purchased by the Hunt Irving Funeral Home in 2007.

In 1968, Leake took her first city hall job as a receptionist for Mayor John H. Nacrelli. She became interested in politics through working as a poll watcher at the Hunt Funeral Home. She was appointed to the Chester Upland school board and was elected to a seat on the board in 1977. She continued to work at city hall and became the administrative assistant to her predecessor, Mayor Joseph F. Battle Jr. in 1979.

Leake was appointed as city treasurer in 1982 and became the first woman elected to the city council in 1983. She also served as a Pennsylvania GOP committeewoman.

Leake served as a member of the Chester City Council from 1984 to 1986. She was unanimously voted to complete the unexpired term of Joseph F. Battle Jr. who left office after being elected county sheriff. Leake was mayor of Chester from 1986 to 1991.

In 1992, Leake lost re-election as mayor to Democrat Barbara Bohannan-Sheppard, ending Republican rule of Chester since 1866.

=== Trash incinerator controversy ===
A major controversy during her tenure as mayor involved the decision to build a trash incinerator in Chester. The Leake administration was developing plans to build a large incinerator able to handle 4,000 tons of trash a day. Meanwhile, Delaware County officials contracted with the Westinghouse Corporation to develop a more modestly sized incinerator in Chester.

While Chester officials argued that their plans for a trash incinerator were safer for residents than the one planned by Delaware County, there was also a major difference in finances where the Chester developed plant would have meant $34 million in profit for the city, while the Delaware County developed plant would only provide $2 million annually.

A major public confrontation occurred between proponents of the city and county plans on April 27, 1988, at a public hearing sponsored by the Pennsylvania Department of Environmental Resources (DER). Hundreds of angry Chester residents gathered in the Chester High School auditorium along with Leake and Pennsylvania representative Robert C. Wright.

On October 25, 1988, Chester city council signed an agreement to allow the development of the county sponsored Westinghouse trash incinerator plant in Chester with Leake abstaining. The groundbreaking for the new incinerator plant occurred on December 15, 1988. The plant opened in the summer of 1991 and was operated by Westinghouse until 1997. It now operates as the Delaware Valley Resource Recovery Facility run by Covanta.

== Personal life ==
Leake died of cancer on August 28, 1997, aged 65, at her home. She is interred at Haven Memorial Cemetery in Aston, Pennsylvania.

== See also ==
- List of mayors of Chester, Pennsylvania

Political offices
Preceded by Joseph F. Battle Jr.	Mayor of Chester; 1986–1991	Succeeded by Barbara Bohannan-Sheppard
