= Ruth L. Bennett =

American social reformer (1866-1947)

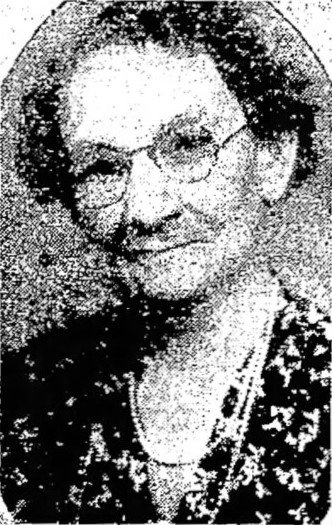
- Born: June 21, 1866; Alabama, U.S.
- Died: February 24, 1947 (aged 80)
- Resting place: Eden Cemetery, Collingdale, Pennsylvania, U.S.
- Occupations: Women's club founder, president of the Chester, Pennsylvania branch of the NAACP

Ruth L. Bennett (June 21, 1866 – February 24, 1947) was an American social reformer, women's club founder and the first president of the Chester, Pennsylvania branch of the National Association for the Advancement of Colored People (NAACP). She founded the Ruth L. Bennett Improvement Club, the Ruth L. Bennett Community House for Colored Women and Girls and the Wilson Nursery to help migrant black women from the southern United States who moved to Chester as part of the Great Migration. She served as president of the Pennsylvania State Federation of Negro Women's Clubs.

The Ruth L. Bennett House, the Ruth L. Bennett Homes public housing development, and the Ruth Bennett Community Farm in Chester are named in her honor.

== Early life ==
Bennett was born in Alabama on June 21, 1866 and moved to Chester, Pennsylvania, in 1914 with her husband, Reverend R.J. Bennett. The Reverend preached at Calvary Baptist Church in the West end of Chester.

== Career ==
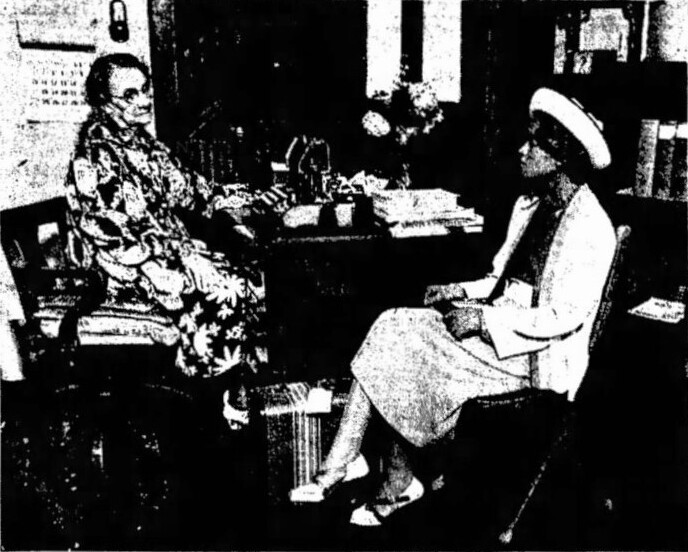
Bennett (left) directing the Ruth L. Bennett Improvement Club in 1938

During the Great Migration, thousands of black southerners migrated to Chester, Pennsylvania, in search of jobs with good wages and to escape racial segregation and discrimination in the South. Many of these migrants were young women, separated from their families, with no work or place to stay. Bennett supported these women with the creation of the Ruth L. Bennett Improvement Club which provided clothing and religious instructions as well as classes on cooking, dressmaking and hygiene.

In 1910, Bennett became the first president of the Chester branch of the NAACP. The first meeting of the organization was held at the Ruth L. Bennett Home for Women.

In 1915, Bennett became the president of the Pennsylvania State Federation of Negro Women's Clubs which had branches in Philadelphia, Coatesville, West Chester and other parts of the states.

In 1918, the club opened the Ruth Bennett Community House for Colored Women and Girls for the shelter and care of migrant women. In 1925, Bennett opened the Wilson Nursery which provided housing for orphans.

By 1940, the Bennett House had provided shelter for over 2,000 black women and girls in need.

== Death and legacy ==
Bennett died on February 24, 1947.

The Ruth L. Bennett House and the 260 unit Ruth L. Bennett Homes public housing development, built in 1952, were named in her honor. The Ruth L. Bennett Community Farm is an educational farm and environmental center that operates on 2 acres at the Ruth L. Bennett Homes in Chester.

== Gallery ==
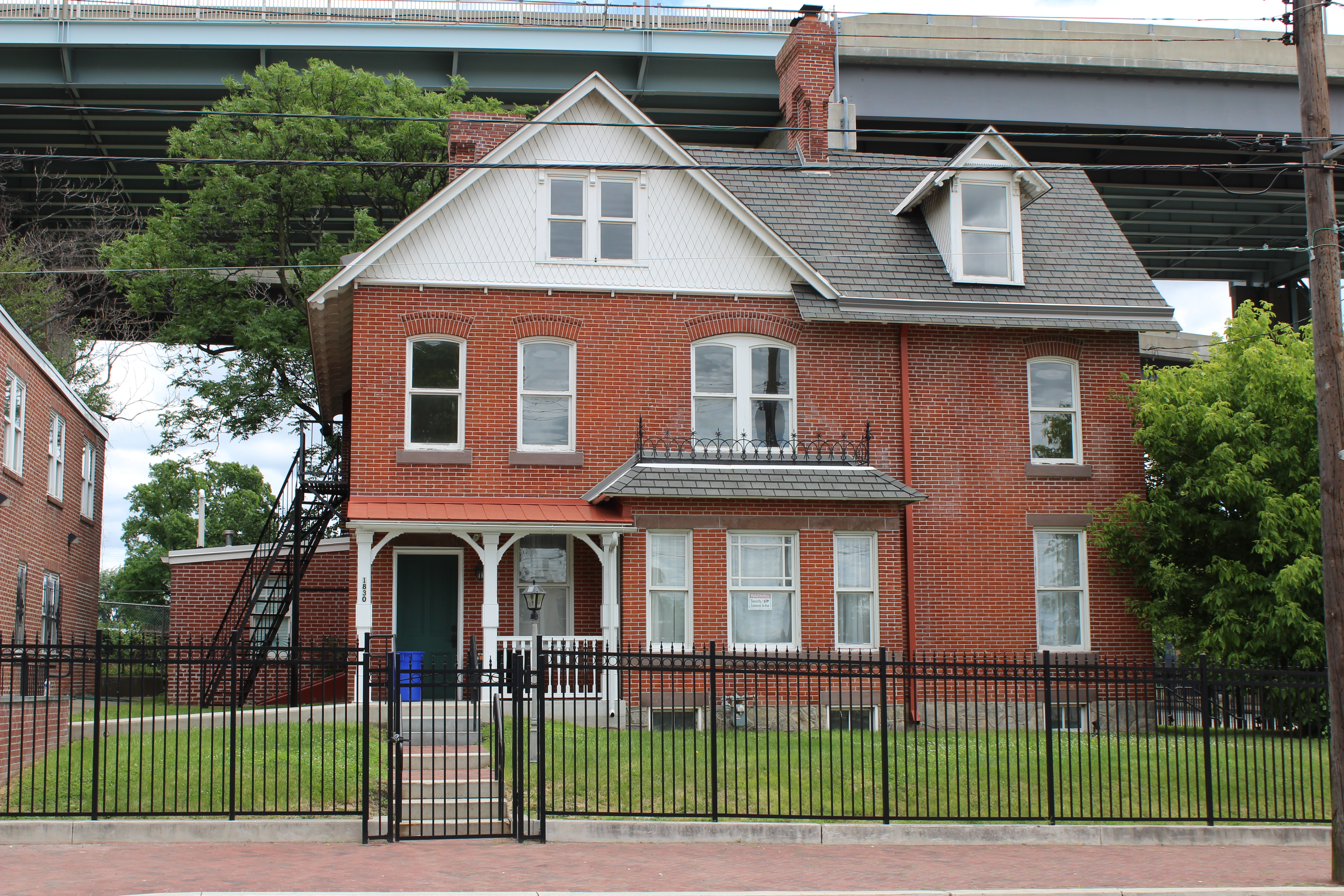
Ruth L. Bennett House

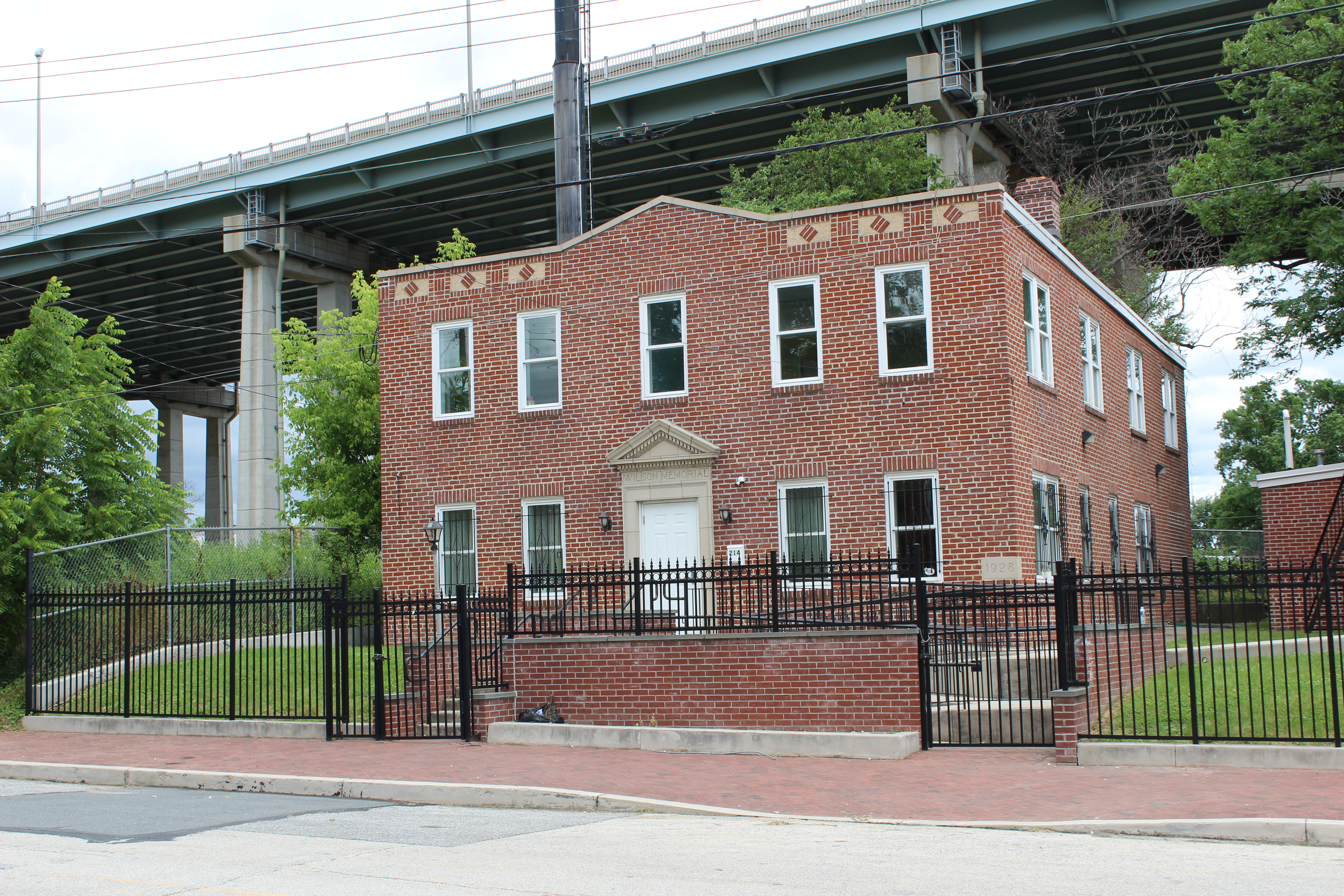
Wilson Nursery next to the Ruth L. Bennett House

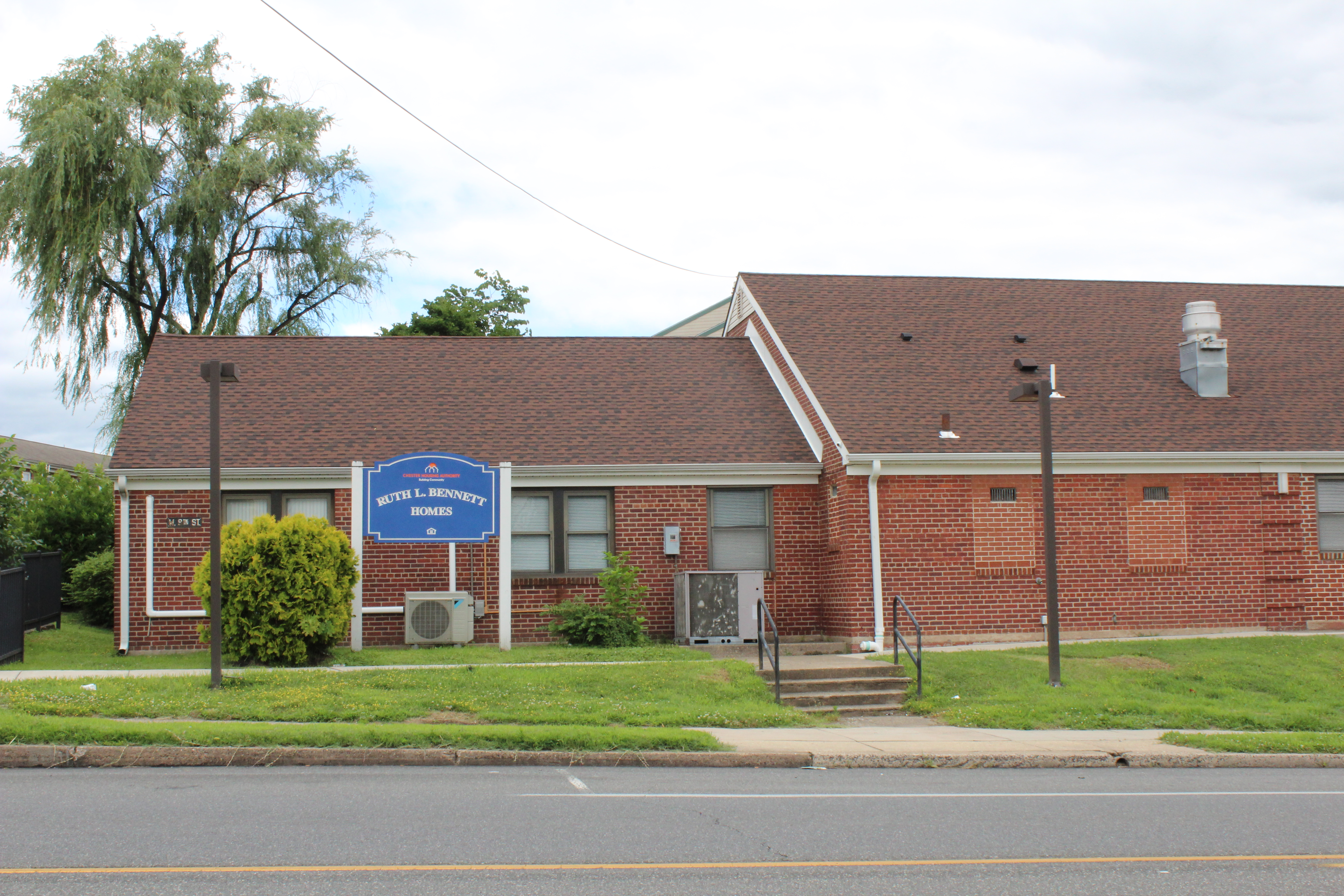
Sign for the Ruth L. Bennett Homes public housing development

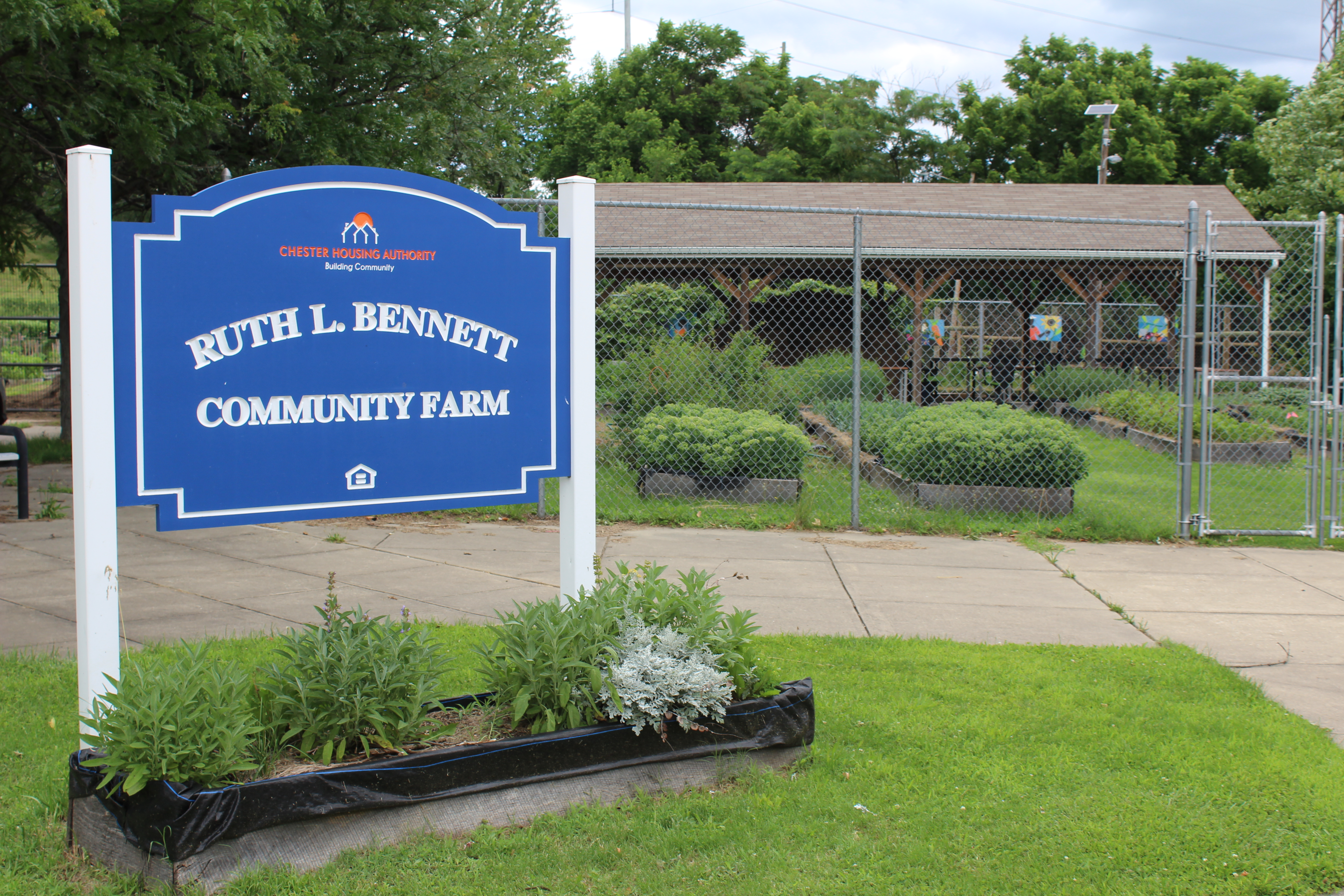
Ruth L. Bennett Community Farm
