= Chester Upland School District =

School district in Pennsylvania, U.S.

Chester-Upland School District
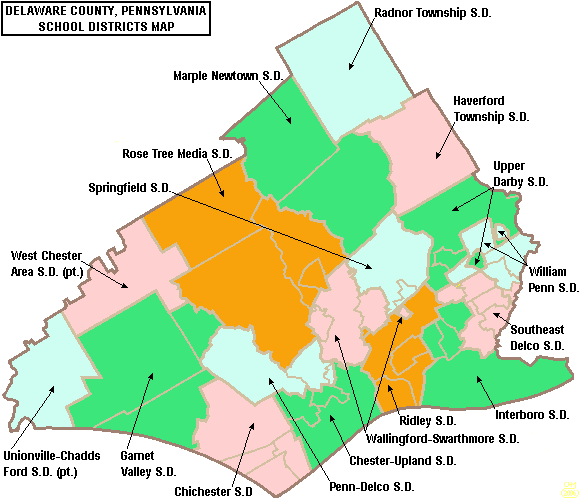

Address
- 1350 Edgemont Avenue Chester, Pennsylvania, 19013; United States

District information
- Type: Public
- Grades: Pre-K through 12
- Superintendent: Latrice N. Mumin, Ed. D., MBA (Interim)

Students and staff
- District mascot: Clippers

Other information
- Website: www.chesteruplandsd.org

The Chester Upland School District (CUSD) is a midsized, urban public school district serving the City of Chester, the Borough of Upland and Chester Township in Delaware County, Pennsylvania. The Chester-Upland School District administrative offices are located in Chester.

According to 2000 federal census data, it served a resident population of 44,435. In 2009, the district residents' per capita income was $13,521, while the median family income was $30,900. In the Commonwealth, the median family income was $49,501 and the United States median family income was $49,445, in 2010. By 2010, the district's population declined to 41,173 people. The educational attainment levels for the Chester Upland School District population (25 years old and over) were 79.8% high school graduates and 10.2% college graduates.

According to the Pennsylvania Budget and Policy Center, 76.4% of the district's pupils lived at 185% or below the Federal Poverty Level as demonstrated by their eligibility for the federal free or reduced price school meal programs in 2012. In Delaware County, the median household income was $61,876. By 2013, the median household income in the United States rose to $52,100.

Chester-Upland School District operates a high school (on two campuses) and five elementary schools. High school students may choose to attend Delaware County Technical High School for training in the construction and mechanical trades. The Delaware County Intermediate Unit IU25 provides the district with a wide variety of services like specialized education for disabled students and hearing, speech and visual disability services and professional development for staff and faculty.

== History ==
In 1953, the United States Supreme Court rendered its decision in the case Brown v. Board of Education of Topeka declaring state laws establishing separate schools for black and white students to be unconstitutional. The Chester Board of Education technically met the requirements of integration; however, board policy allowed students to request transfers to schools outside their neighborhood. The board approved most transfers for white students but few for black students. As a result, in 1953, five elementary schools in Chester were almost completely black. Yet each of those five schools had white students living within its district that were allowed to attend all-white schools in other parts of town.

From November 1963 to April 1964, the Chester school protests were initiated by the Committee for Freedom Now and the Chester branch of the NAACP to protest the de facto segregation of schools. In April 1964, almost nightly protests against the Chester School Board policy were marked by violence and police brutality. George Raymond, president of the NAACP Chester branch presented the school board with a list of 10 demands including teacher transfers, transportation of students to schools in other neighborhoods, hiring blacks for supervisory positions and hiring more black secretaries. Over six hundred people were arrested over a two-month period of civil rights rallies, marches, pickets, boycotts and sit-ins.

A 1964 hearing from the Pennsylvania Human Rights commission reported findings from investigators sent into Chester schools that concluded there was "maintenance of all-one color schools, assignment of Negro teachers to all-Negro schools, inferior educational standards in nonwhite schools, failure to appoint Negroes to supervisory and administrative positions and gerrymandering of boundary lines defining school zones in order to perpetuate all Negro schools".

=== Recent history ===
In 1994, Chester Upland was named by the state as the worst-performing school district in Pennsylvania. The district had a multimillion-dollar deficit and its decision-making ability was taken over by the state. A for-profit company, Edison Schools, was hired to try to improve the struggling district's test scores in 2001. After four years it was determined that Edison was not successful in turning the district around. A number of incidents, including an allegation of sexual misconduct on the part of an Edison employee, and policies such as not allowing students to bring home books, led to the state's decision to break its contract with Edison.

The district has regained local public control, but remains one of the lowest-performing in Pennsylvania. 72% of district students are eligible for free or reduced-price lunches, as compared to the state average of 33%. In recent years it has opened a number of selective-admission magnet schools.

== Governance ==
As of 2023 the headquarters are at 232 W. 9th Street.

At one point the district headquarters were on the first floor of Chester High School.

== Schools ==
In 2011, nearly 45 percent of Chester Upland School District resident's children attend public charter schools. Many of the community's elementary students attend the K-8 Chester Community Charter School, the state's largest, which as of 2012 academically outperformed the district’s schools.

High schools

- Chester High School (Chester)
- STEM at Showalter (7th through 12th 2014)

Primary schools

- Main Street Elementary School (Upland) PreK through 5th (2014)
- Margaret C. Stetser Elementary School (Chester) PreK through 6th (2014)
- Toby Farms Intermediate School (Chester Township) 6th through 8th (2014)
- Chester Upland School for the Arts (CUSA) Pre-K through 5th

== Charter schools ==
Students in the district may also opt to attend a variety of public charter schools, including Chester Charter School for the Arts, Chester Community Charter School (K–8), Widener Partnership Charter School (K–8) (operated by Widener University), or one of the statewide cyber charter schools. In 2006, over one third of the district's students have chosen to attend charter schools. By 2011–12, charter attendance at a charter school had risen to over 45%. of the district's pupils. In 2011–12, 2,697 Chester Upland SD students attend CCCS, while 329 attend WPCS.

The Chester Upland School Board rejected the establishment of several charter schools: Chester Charter School for Theater Arts and Excel Charter School, which intended to focus on dropouts, was rejected in fall 2011. In July 2012, the Pennsylvania Charter School Appeal Board approved the school to open for the 2012–13 school year.

== Extracurriculars ==
The Chester Upland School District offers a wide variety of clubs, activities and an extensive, publicly funded sports program.

=== Sports ===
The district funds:

Varsity

Boys

- Baseball - AAAA
- Basketball- AAAA
- Cross Country - AAA
- Football - AAAA
- Indoor Track and Field - AAAA
- Tennis - AAA
- Track and Field - AAA

Girls

- Basketball - AAAA
- Cross Country - AAA
- Indoor Track and Field - AAAA
- Girls' Tennis - AAA
- Track and Field - AAA
- Volleyball - AAA
