= J. Pius Barbour =

American Baptist pastor (1894–1974)

Josephus Pius Barbour
- Born: June 8, 1894; Galveston, Texas, U.S.
- Died: January 5, 1974 (aged 79); Philadelphia, Pennsylvania, U.S.
- Resting place: Calvary Baptist Church, Chester, Pennsylvania, U.S.
- Occupations: Pastor, executive director of the National Baptist Association, editor of the National Baptist Voice publication

Josephus Pius Barbour (June 8, 1894 - January 5, 1974) was an American Baptist pastor of Calvary Baptist Church in Chester, Pennsylvania who served as an executive director of the National Baptist Association and editor of the National Baptist Voice publication. He graduated from Crozer Theological Seminary in 1937, and later mentored a teenaged Martin Luther King Jr., when King was a student there.

== Early life and education ==
Barbour was born in Galveston, Texas. He received his Bachelor of Arts degree from Morehouse College in 1917 and a Master of Theology degree from Crozer Theological Seminary in 1937.

== Career ==
From 1919 to 1921, Barbour was a faculty member at Tuskegee Institute. In 1921, Barbour became pastor of the Day Street Baptist Church in Montgomery, Alabama and served until 1931. While serving as a pastor in Montgomery, Barbour called for a gathering in response to efforts by the state to undermine black voting rights. From 1931 to 1933, he was pastor of Mt. Olive Baptist Church in Fort Wayne, Indiana. He became pastor of the Calvary Baptist Church in Chester, Pennsylvania, in 1933 and served in that capacity until his death in 1974.

Barbour was a member of the executive board of the National Baptist Convention and was the editor of its publication, the National Baptist Voice, for 17 years.

Barbour was active in the local Chester civil right activism partnering with George Raymond, the president of the NAACP Chester branch. He was the chief strategist of activism for twenty years and was well respected by blacks and whites within the community for his measured and pragmatic approach. He supplemented his preacher salary by working in local politics as a representative of the African-American community in Chester.

== Mentoring of Martin Luther King Jr. ==
Martin Luther King Jr. attended Calvary Baptist Church while studying at Crozer Theological Seminary from 1948 to 1951. King's father, Martin Luther King Sr., knew Barbour for years through their affiliation with the National Baptist Association and asked Barbour to take the then-19-year-old King under his care and to monitor his studies and activities at Crozer.

King served as a Sunday School teacher and youth minister at Calvary Baptist and the church became his home away from home. King was a frequent guest at the Barbour house for the southern cooking but also the academic debates and challenging ideas. King and Barbour became "like father and son" and King's biographer, Lawrence D. Reddick, stated that Dr. King credited Barbour as one of the single most influential forces in his life. Barbour and King maintained frequent correspondedence throughout King's life.

== Personal life ==
Barbour was married to Olee Littlejohn Barbour and together they had three children.

Barbour was a member of the NAACP, the Ministerial association, the Council of Churches, the American Academy of Political and Social Science, the Society of Biblical Literature and Exegesis, and the Alpha Phi Alpha fraternity. He also served as a board member of the Chester Water Authority.

Barbour died of gastroenteritis following a cerebral hemorrhage at Lankenau Medical Center in Wynnewood, Pennsylvania. Barbour is interred on the Calvary Baptist Church grounds.
