= Cynthia M. Rufe =

American judge (born 1948)

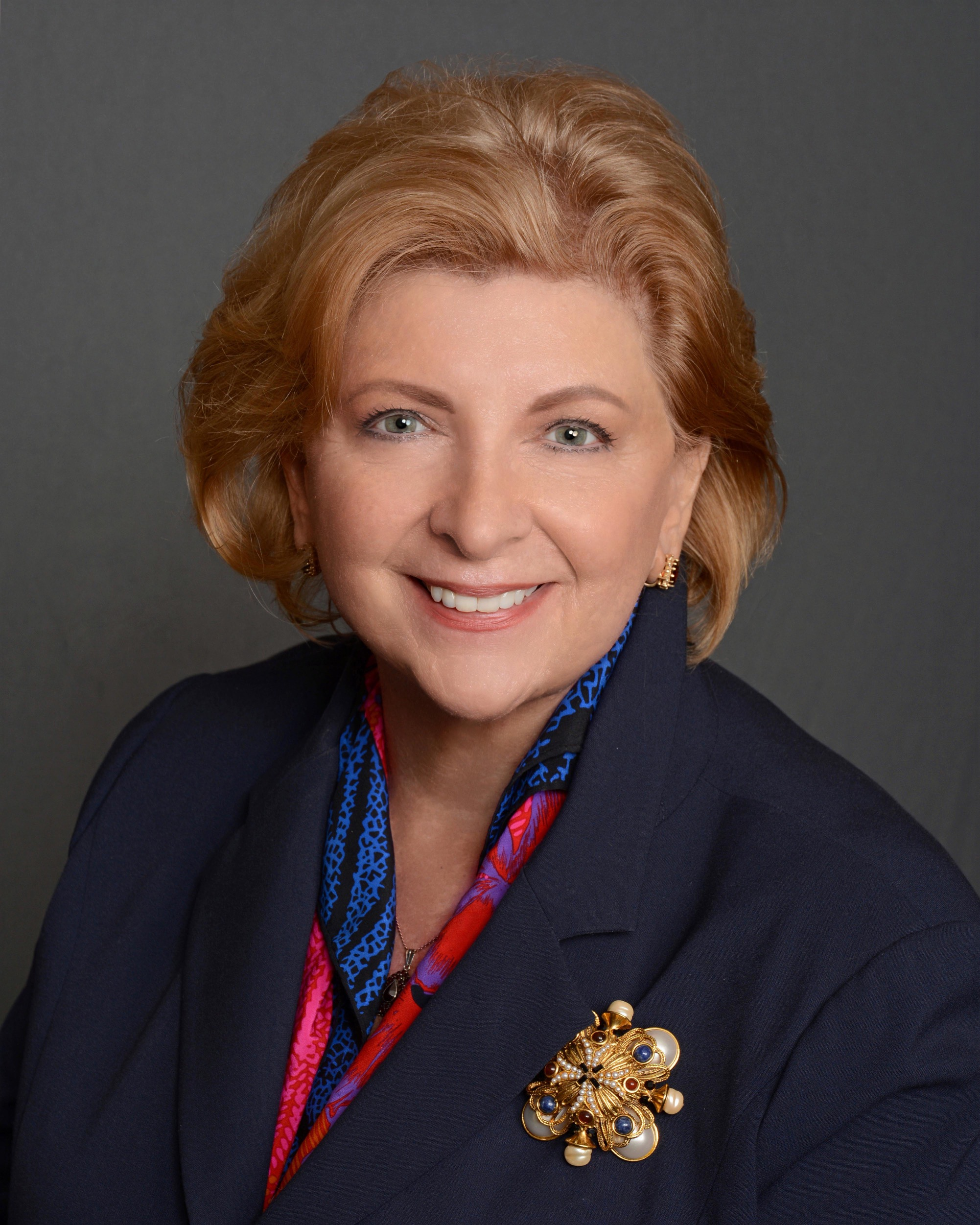
- Judge Rufe in 2024

Senior Judge of the United States District Court for the Eastern District of Pennsylvania
- Incumbent
- Assumed office December 31, 2021

Judge of the United States District Court for the Eastern District of Pennsylvania
- In office May 3, 2002 – December 31, 2021
- Appointed by: George W. Bush
- Preceded by: Norma Levy Shapiro
- Succeeded by: Mary Kay Costello

Personal details
- Born: Cynthia Marie Favata; 1948 (age 77–78) Philadelphia, Pennsylvania, U.S.
- Education: Adelphi University (BA); University at Buffalo (JD)

Cynthia Marie Rufe (née Favata; born 1948) is a senior United States district judge of the United States District Court for the Eastern District of Pennsylvania.

== Early life and education ==
Born in Philadelphia, Pennsylvania, Rufe graduated from Adelphi University with her Bachelor of Arts degree in 1970 and later from University at Buffalo Law School with a Juris Doctor in 1977.

== Career ==
Following law school graduation, Rufe served as a public defender in Bucks County, Pennsylvania, spending much of her tenure there in the juvenile division. She became a deputy public defender in 1980. Soon thereafter, she left government service to practice privately. She practiced in her own firm for 11 years, gaining prominence in the local legal community. In 1994, she was elected as a judge of the Bucks County Court of Common Pleas, where she served for eight years, until 2002.

=== Federal judicial service ===
On the recommendation of Senators Arlen Specter and Rick Santorum, Rufe was nominated to the United States District Court for the Eastern District of Pennsylvania by President George W. Bush on January 23, 2002 to a seat vacated by Judge Norma Levy Shapiro. Rufe was confirmed by the United States Senate on April 30, 2002 and received her commission on May 3, 2002. She assumed senior status on December 31, 2021.

In February 2026, she ruled that panels depicting enslaved lives must be reinstated at the President's House site in Philadelphia. In her judgement she quoted from George Orwell's dystopian Nineteen Eighty-Four and wrote:

As if the Ministry of Truth in George Orwell's 1984 now existed, with its motto "Ignorance is Strength," this Court is now asked to determine whether the federal government has the power it claims—to dissemble and disassemble historical truths when it has some domain over historical facts. It does not.

== Sources ==
Legal offices
Preceded by Norma Levy Shapiro	Judge of the United States District Court for the Eastern District of Pennsylvania; 2002–2021	Succeeded by Mary Kay Costello
