= Norma Levy Shapiro =

American judge

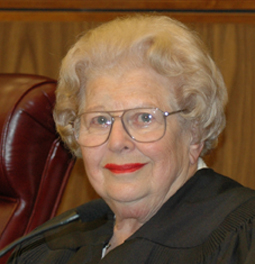

Senior Judge of the United States District Court for the Eastern District of Pennsylvania
- In office December 31, 1998 – July 22, 2016

Judge of the United States District Court for the Eastern District of Pennsylvania
- In office August 11, 1978 – December 31, 1998
- Appointed by: Jimmy Carter
- Preceded by: James Henry Gorbey
- Succeeded by: Cynthia M. Rufe

Personal details
- Born: Norma Sondra Levy; July 27, 1928 Philadelphia, Pennsylvania
- Died: July 22, 2016 (aged 87) Wynnewood, Pennsylvania
- Education: University of Michigan (BA); University of Pennsylvania Law School (JD)

Norma Sondra Levy Shapiro (July 27, 1928 – July 22, 2016) was a United States district judge of the United States District Court for the Eastern District of Pennsylvania.

== Education and career ==
Born Norma Sondra Levy in Philadelphia, Pennsylvania, Shapiro was Jewish. She received a Bachelor of Arts degree from the University of Michigan in 1948 and a Juris Doctor from the University of Pennsylvania Law School in 1951, graduating Order of the Coif. She was a law clerk for Judge Horace Stern of the Supreme Court of Pennsylvania from 1951 to 1952. She was a Gowen fellow in criminal law at the University of Pennsylvania from 1954 to 1955. She was in private practice in Philadelphia from 1956 to 1978, during which time she became the first female partner at Dechert. She was an Instructor/lecturer at the University of Pennsylvania Law School from 1951 to 1952, from 1955 to 1956, and in 1971.

== Federal judicial service ==
Shapiro was nominated to the United States District Court for the Eastern District of Pennsylvania by President Jimmy Carter on August 1, 1978, to a seat vacated by Judge James Henry Gorbey. She was confirmed by the United States Senate on August 11, 1978, and received her commission the same day. She assumed senior status on December 31, 1998. She died on July 22, 2016, at the age of 87 at the Lankenau Medical Center in Wynnewood, Lower Merion Township, Pennsylvania, after a brief illness.

== See also ==
- List of Jewish American jurists
- List of first women lawyers and judges in Pennsylvania

== Sources ==
Legal offices
Preceded by James Henry Gorbey	Judge of the United States District Court for the Eastern District of Pennsylvania; 1978–1998	Succeeded by Cynthia M. Rufe
