= Barbara Bohannan-Sheppard =

American politician (born 1950)

Mayor of Chester, Pennsylvania
- In office 1992–1995
- Preceded by: Willie Mae Leake
- Succeeded by: Dr. Aaron Wilson, Jr.

Personal details
- Born: June 15, 1950 (age 76) Onancock, Virginia
- Party: Democratic

Barbara Bohannan-Sheppard (born June 15, 1950) is an American politician who served as mayor of Chester, Pennsylvania from 1992 to 1995. Bohannan-Sheppard was the first Democrat to be elected mayor of Chester in almost a century and the second female and second African-American mayor of Chester.

Bohannan-Sheppard became mayor when Chester was failing economically, recovering from corruption in city government and experiencing racial strife and a high crime rate. She was a proponent for environmental justice for the residents of Chester but created a major controversy when she hired a male administrative assistant who had been convicted and served several years in prison for rape and murder.

== Early life and education ==
Bohannan-Sheppard was born in Onancock, Virginia, a small town on the Eastern Shore of Virginia. She was the oldest of seven children in a family from her father's second marriage. The family was poor; her father worked as a cook in a hotel in Ocean City, Maryland during the tourist season and her mother worked at a chicken processing plant. When she was 18 her father sent her to live with her half-brother in Philadelphia, Pennsylvania to serve as a babysitter for his children. She met and married a SEPTA bus driver and they had two sons. She worked as a pharmacy technician and as a professional union organizer for the National Union of Hospital and Health Care Employees.

She moved to Chester, Pennsylvania with her two sons after the marriage ended, in order to attend Widener College with the hope of becoming an attorney. She was forced to drop out because she could not afford the cost of tuition. She started an in-home day care business as a way of making money and a home for her two children at the same time. She remarried in 1990, to Monroe Sheppard, who owned an auto repair shop.

== Career ==
Bohannan-Sheppard was elected mayor as Chester neared the bottom of its long post-industrial decline. The city was failing economically and experiencing racial strife, falling real estate prices, a declining population, and a rising crime rate.

In 1991, Bohannan-Sheppard became the second female African-American mayor of Chester, defeating Willie Mae James Leake on a wave of public anger due to corruption in city government. A number of community groups came together to register over 3,400 new voters. Bohannan-Sheppard was the first Democrat to be elected mayor of Chester since William H. Berry in 1905. Two other Democrats also won seats on the Chester City Council, giving Democrats control of the city government for the first time in 125 years.

=== Environmental Justice ===
Bohannan-Sheppard led efforts seeking environmental justice for the residents of Chester. She coordinated a town meeting of Chester residents, government officials, industry representatives, Environmental Protection Agency representatives and Pennsylvania Department of Environmental Protection representatives to raise concerns about pollution, noise and trucks associated with the placement of the Westinghouse Corporation trash incinerator in Chester. Bohannan-Sheppard argued that the addition of a contaminated soil remediation facility along with the Westinghouse trash incinerator, the DELCORA sewage waste treatment center and the Abbonizio Recycling facility resulted in "environmental apartheid" for the residents of majority African-American Chester.

=== Robert Hill controversy ===
Bohannan-Sheppard created a major controversy by hiring Robert Hill, a convicted murderer and rapist who had served his time in prison, as her chief administrative assistant. When he was 14, Hill killed an insurance agent by beating him and stabbing him 17 times and served nine years for that crime. Hill was subsequently convicted for the rape of a 16-year-old girl and served 3 1/2 more years in prison.

Bohannan-Sheppard defended the appointment stating that she did not know about Hill's criminal past until after he was hired and that he had served his debt to society. The controversy divided the city government. The city council voted to eliminate Hill's salary, with Sheppard being the only opposing vote, after Sheppard refused to fire him.

In 1995, Bohannan-Sheppard lost her re-election bid for mayor and was replaced by Republican Dr. Aaron Wilson, Jr.

== See also ==
- List of mayors of Chester, Pennsylvania

Political offices
Preceded by Willie Mae Leake	Mayor of Chester; 1992–1995	Succeeded by Dr. Aaron Wilson, Jr.
