= Stanley Branche =

American civil rights leader (1933–1992)

Stanley Everett Branche
- Born: July 31, 1933
- Died: December 22, 1992 (aged 59)
- Resting place: Mount Lawn Cemetery, Sharon Hill, Pennsylvania, U.S.
- Occupations: Civil rights leader, nightclub owner

Stanley Everett Branche (July 31, 1933 – December 22, 1992) was an American civil rights leader from Pennsylvania who worked as executive secretary in the Chester, Pennsylvania, branch of the National Association for the Advancement of Colored People (NAACP) and founded the Committee for Freedom Now (CFFN).

In the early 1960s, he and George Raymond partnered to challenge minority hiring practices of businesses and initiated the Chester school protests against de facto segregation of schools which made Chester one of the noted locations of the civil rights movement. He protested with the Cambridge Movement in Dorchester County, Maryland, and worked with Cecil B. Moore to desegregate Girard College in Philadelphia, Pennsylvania. He worked with the Greater Chester Movement and the Black Coalition in Philadelphia. He ran unsuccessfully for mayor of Chester in 1967 and twice for U.S. Congress in 1978 and 1986. He left the civil rights movement and ran multiple businesses including co-ownership of a nightclub in Philadelphia with drug kingpin, Major Coxson. In 1989, he was convicted and sentenced to 5 years in federal prison for his participation in an organized crime collection scheme.

== Early life and education ==
Branche served as a paratrooper with the 82nd Airborne Division and the 127th Regimental Combat Team in the Korean War. He was decorated three times. After the war, he attended the Combs College of Music and the Pennsylvania Institute of Criminology with the intent to be a policeman.

== Civil rights career ==
Branche participated in the Cambridge Movement in Dorchester County, Maryland, as the field secretary for the NAACP. He was one of the signatories of "The Treaty of Cambridge" which initiated desegregation in the city. He returned to Chester in 1962 and his wife Anna introduced him to George Raymond, president of the Chester branch of the NAACP. Branche was initially assigned to the campaign to desegregate the Great Leopard Skating Rink. Branche and Raymond partnered to successfully challenge the minority hiring practices of large department stores, clothing shops, shoe stores and other specialty shops in downtown Chester.

By the fall of 1963, Branche became frustrated with the gradualist approach of Raymond and the NAACP. He resigned and created a new activist organization named the Committee for Freedom Now (CFFN) along with the Swarthmore College chapter of Students for a Democratic Society and Chester parents to end de facto segregation of public schools and improve conditions at predominantly black schools in Chester.

In 1962, Branche and the CFFN focused on improving conditions at the predominantly black Franklin Elementary school in Chester. Although the school was built to house 500 students, it had become overcrowded with 1,200 students. The school's average class-size was 39, twice the number of nearby all-white schools. The school was built in 1910 and had never been updated. Only two bathrooms were available for the entire school.

In November 1963, CFFN protesters blocked the entrance to Franklin Elementary school and the Chester Municipal Building resulting in the arrest of 240 protesters. Following public attention to the protests stoked by media coverage of the mass arrests, the mayor and school board negotiated with the CFFN and NAACP. The Chester Board of Education agreed to reduce class sizes at Franklin school, remove unsanitary toilet facilities, relocate classes held in the boiler room and coal bin and repair school grounds.

Emboldened by the success of the Franklin Elementary school demonstrations, the CFFN recruited new members, sponsored voter registration drives and planned a citywide boycott of Chester schools. Branche built close ties with students at Swarthmore College, Pennsylvania Military College and Cheyney State College in order to ensure large turnouts at demonstrations and protests. Branche invited Dick Gregory and Malcolm X to Chester to participate in the "Freedom Now Conference" and other national civil rights leaders such as Gloria Richardson came to Chester in support of the demonstrations.

In the spring of 1964, huge protests over multiple days ensued which resulted in mass arrests of protesters. The mayor of Chester, James Gorbey, issued "The Police Position to Preserve the Public Peace", a ten-point statement promising an immediate return to law and order. The city deputized firemen and trash collectors to help handle demonstrators. The State of Pennsylvania deployed 50 state troopers to assist the 77-member Chester police force. The demonstrations were marked by violence and charges of police brutality. Over six hundred people were arrested over a two-month period of civil rights rallies, marches, pickets, boycotts and sit-ins.

Branche acted as press spokesman, community liaison, recruiter and chief negotiator. Governor William Scranton convinced Branche to obey a court-ordered moratorium on demonstrations. Scranton created the Pennsylvania Human Relations Commission to conduct hearings on the de facto segregation of public schools. All protests were discontinued while the commission held hearings during the summer of 1964.

In November 1964, the Pennsylvania Human Relations Commission concluded that the Chester School Board had violated the law and ordered Chester School District to desegregate the city's six predominantly African-American schools. The city appealed the ruling, which delayed implementation.

In June 1964, Chester city leaders formed the Greater Chester Movement (GCM), an umbrella organization intended to coordinate activities of groups working toward the improvement of Chester. When President Lyndon Johnson initiated his War on Poverty, the GCM became a conduit through which federal dollars were distributed in Chester. Branche had originally set up a competing organization named the Committee on Economic Opportunity (CEO) however it was incorporated into the GCM with Branche serving on the steering committee.

In 1968, Branche formed the Black Coalition Movement, a multiracial group formed in the wake of the assassination of Martin Luther King Jr. He worked with Cecil B. Moore to desegregate Girard College in Philadelphia, Pennsylvania. Branche and seven others were arrested when they tried to trespass in the school.

Branche was arrested approximately 225 times during civil rights protests.

== Post civil rights career ==
He left the civil rights movement, moved to Philadelphia and ran several businesses including nightclubs, a security firm, a taxicab company and shoe repair shops. Branche had an unsuccessful run for mayor of Chester in 1967. He co-owned a nightclub, the Rolls Royce Lounge in Center City Philadelphia with a drug kingpin, Major Coxson, and was known to travel throughout Philadelphia with Muhammad Ali. Branche ran for U.S. Representative of Pennsylvania's 1st Congressional District in 1978 but lost to Tom Foglietta. He had another unsuccessful run for Congress in 1986

In 1979, Branche was recruited by W.M. Anderson Co., a mechanical contractor, to become the sole stockholder and chairman of the board. That same year, Branche and an associate Gus Lacy were charged with bribery involving a medical student's attempt to get into Hahnemann Medical College. The charges were dropped in 1980 when a key witness died.

In 1985, Branche partnered with the activist lawyer William Kunstler to file a lawsuit on behalf of MOVE member Louise James in an attempt to force Philadelphia District Attorney Ed Rendell to investigate the Wilson Goode administration's controversial bombing of the MOVE headquarters in West Philadelphia.

Branche was convicted in 1989 and sentenced to five years in federal prison for extortion. A key piece of evidence was an FBI recording of Branche and George Botsaris, a leader of the Philadelphia Greek Mob. Reverend Jesse Jackson was among those that wrote to the parole board in support of Branche's parole.

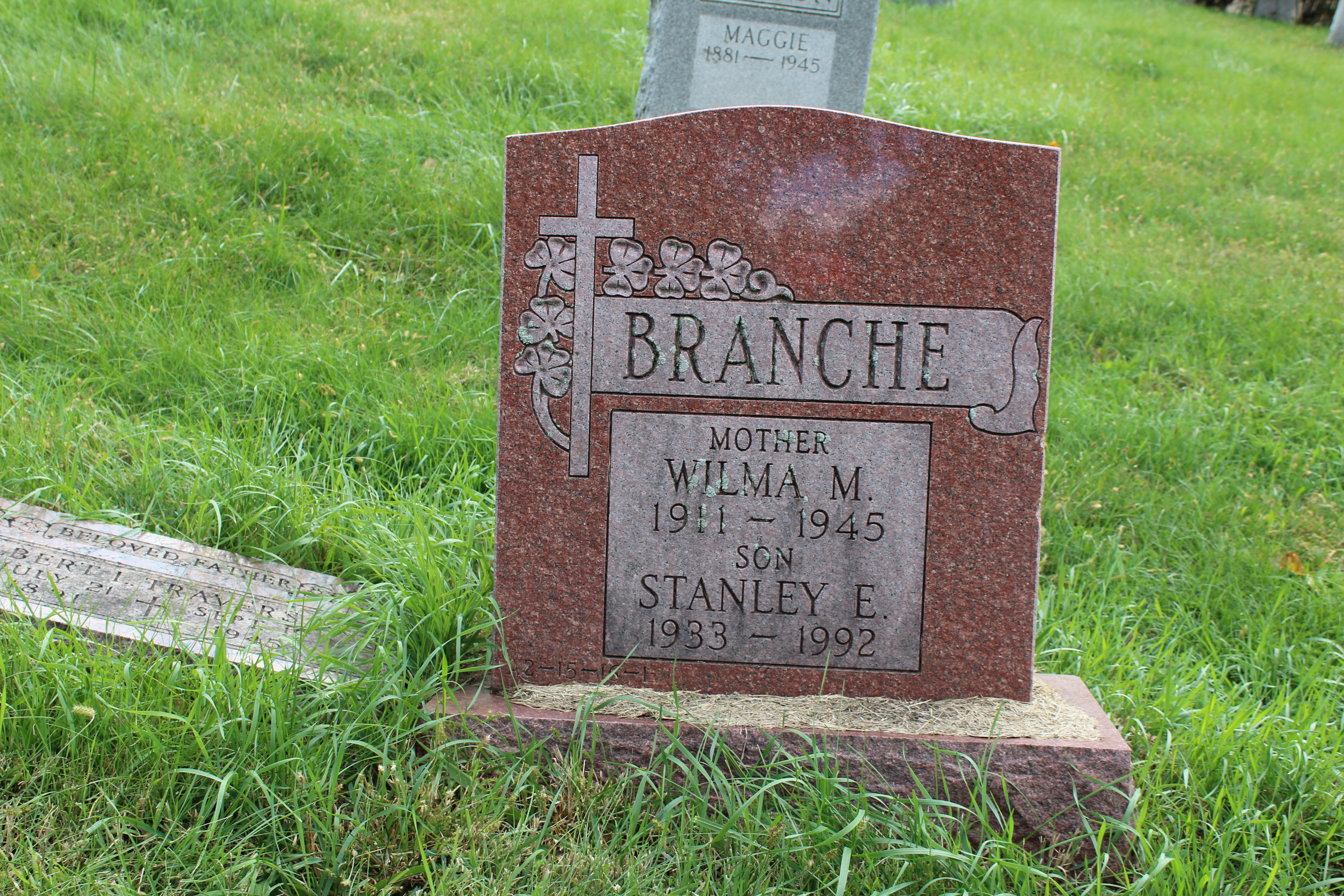
Stanley Branche tombstone in Mount Lawn Cemetery in Sharon Hill, Pennsylvania.

He died on December 22, 1992, of a heart attack.
