= Joseph F. Battle Jr. =

American politician and judge (1937-2001)

Mayor of Chester, Pennsylvania
- In office 1979–1986
- Preceded by: John H. Nacrelli
- Succeeded by: Willie Mae Leake

Personal details
- Born: 1937
- Died: March 9, 2001 (aged 63–64)
- Resting place: Saints Peter and Paul Cemetery, Springfield Township, Pennsylvania, U.S.
- Party: Republican

Joseph F. Battle Jr. (1937 – March 9, 2001) was an American politician and judge who served as Republican mayor of Chester, Pennsylvania, from 1979 to 1986 and judge on the Delaware County Court of Common Pleas from 1987 to 1999.

== Career ==
Battle graduated from University of Pennsylvania Law School in 1962. He worked as chair of the Chester Housing Authority and as city solicitor for Chester.

Battle was appointed interim mayor of Chester by the Chester City Council in 1979 when the previous mayor, John H. Nacrelli, resigned after being convicted of federal bribery and racketeering charges. Battle won reelection as mayor and served until 1986. Battle was replaced as mayor by Willie Mae Leake, the first female and first African-American mayor of Chester, Pennsylvania.

Battle served as Delaware County Sheriff from 1986 to 1988.

In 1987, Battle was appointed judge on the Delaware County Court of Common Pleas by Robert P. Casey and was elected to a ten-year term in 1989.

Battle died on March 10, 2001, and was interred at the Saints Peter and Paul Cemetery in Springfield, Pennsylvania.

== See also ==
- List of mayors of Chester, Pennsylvania

Political offices
Preceded by John H. Nacrelli	Mayor of Chester; 1979–1986	Succeeded by Willie Mae Leake

Legal offices
Preceded by	Judge of the Delaware County Court of Common Pleas; 1987–1999	Succeeded by
