= Mary Kay Costello =

American judge (born 1968)

Mary Costello
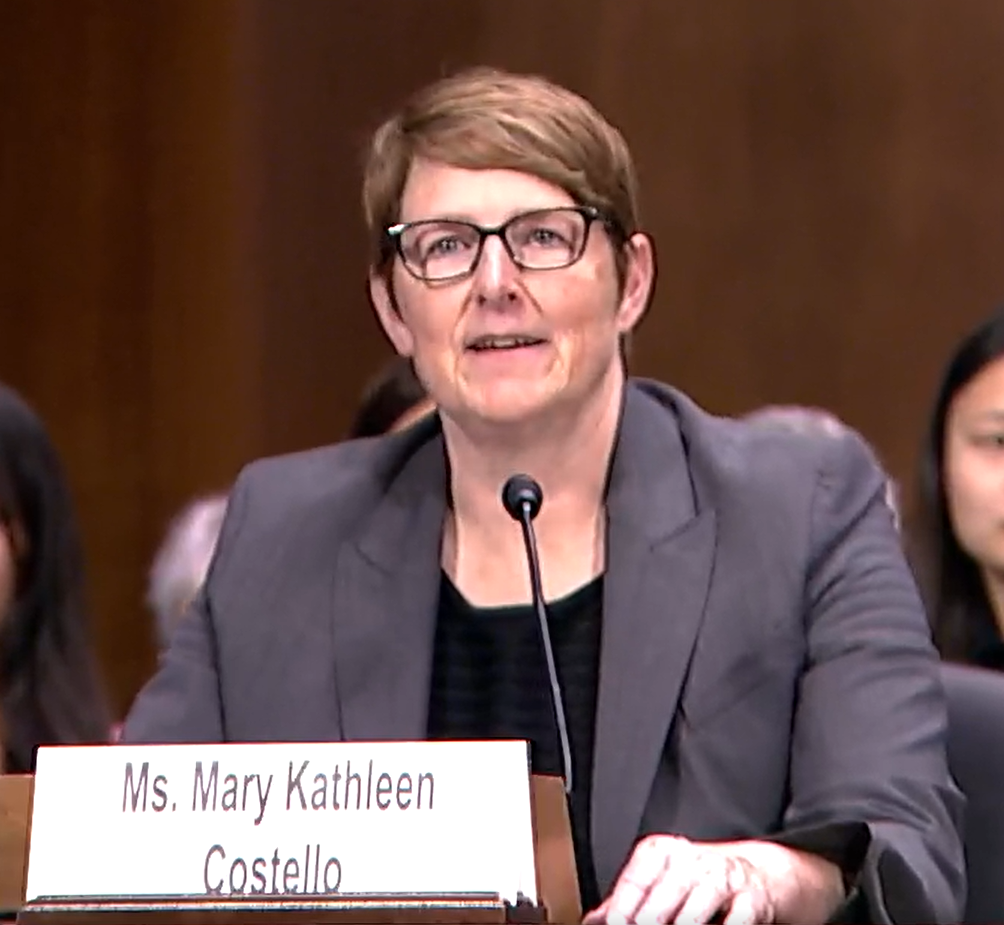

Judge of the United States District Court for the Eastern District of Pennsylvania
- Incumbent
- Assumed office September 19, 2024
- Appointed by: Joe Biden
- Preceded by: Cynthia M. Rufe

Personal details
- Born: Mary Kathleen Costello; 1968 (age 57–58) Bristol, Pennsylvania, U.S.
- Education: Temple University (BA, JD)

Military service
- Branch/service: United States Air Force
- Years of service: 1986–1994
- Rank: Staff Sergeant
- Awards: See list: Air Force Commendation Medal with oak leaf cluster Air Force Achievement Medal Air Force Outstanding Unit Award with oak leaf cluster Air Force Organizational Excellence Award Air Force Good Conduct Medal National Defense Service Medal Air Force Overseas Ribbon Air Force Longevity Service Award Non-Commissioned Officer Professional Development Ribbon Air Force Training Ribbon

Mary Kathleen Costello (born 1968) is an American lawyer who has served as a United States district judge of the United States District Court for the Eastern District of Pennsylvania since September 2024. She previously served as a magistrate judge of the same court from August 2024 to September 2024.

== Education ==
Costello earned a Bachelor of Arts, summa cum laude, from Temple University in 1998 and a Juris Doctor, magna cum laude, from Temple University Beasley School of Law in 2001.

== Career ==
=== Military service ===
Costello joined the U.S. Air Force in 1986. She served for eight years as a cyber-systems operator, receiving an honorable discharge in 1994 as a staff sergeant.

=== Law career ===
From 2001 to 2004, Costello was an associate at Saul Ewing LLP and from 2004 to 2008, she was a litigation associate at Akin Gump Strauss Hauer & Feld. From 2008 to 2024, she served as an assistant United States attorney in the U.S. Attorney's Office for the Eastern District of Pennsylvania, where she prosecuted cases that include public corruption, fraud, and drug trafficking. In August 2024, she left the office to serve as a magistrate judge of the United States District Court for the Eastern District of Pennsylvania while her nomination was still pending.

=== Federal judicial service ===
On June 12, 2024, President Joe Biden announced his intent to nominate Costello to serve as a United States district judge of the United States District Court for the Eastern District of Pennsylvania. On June 13, 2024, her nomination was sent to the Senate. President Biden nominated Costello to the seat vacated by Judge Cynthia M. Rufe, who assumed senior status on December 31, 2021. On July 10, 2024, a hearing on her nomination was held before the Senate Judiciary Committee. On August 1, 2024, her nomination was reported out of committee by a 13–7 vote. On September 17, 2024, the United States Senate invoked cloture on her nomination by a 54–42 vote. Later that day, her nomination was confirmed by a 52–41 vote. With her confirmation, Costello is President Biden's 12th LGBT appointed judge. She received her judicial commission on September 19, 2024.

== See also ==
- List of LGBT jurists in the United States

Legal offices
Preceded by Cynthia M. Rufe	Judge of the United States District Court for the Eastern District of Pennsylvania; 2024–present	Incumbent
