= Delaware Valley Resource Recovery Facility =

Trash incineration plant in Chester, Pennsylvania, USA

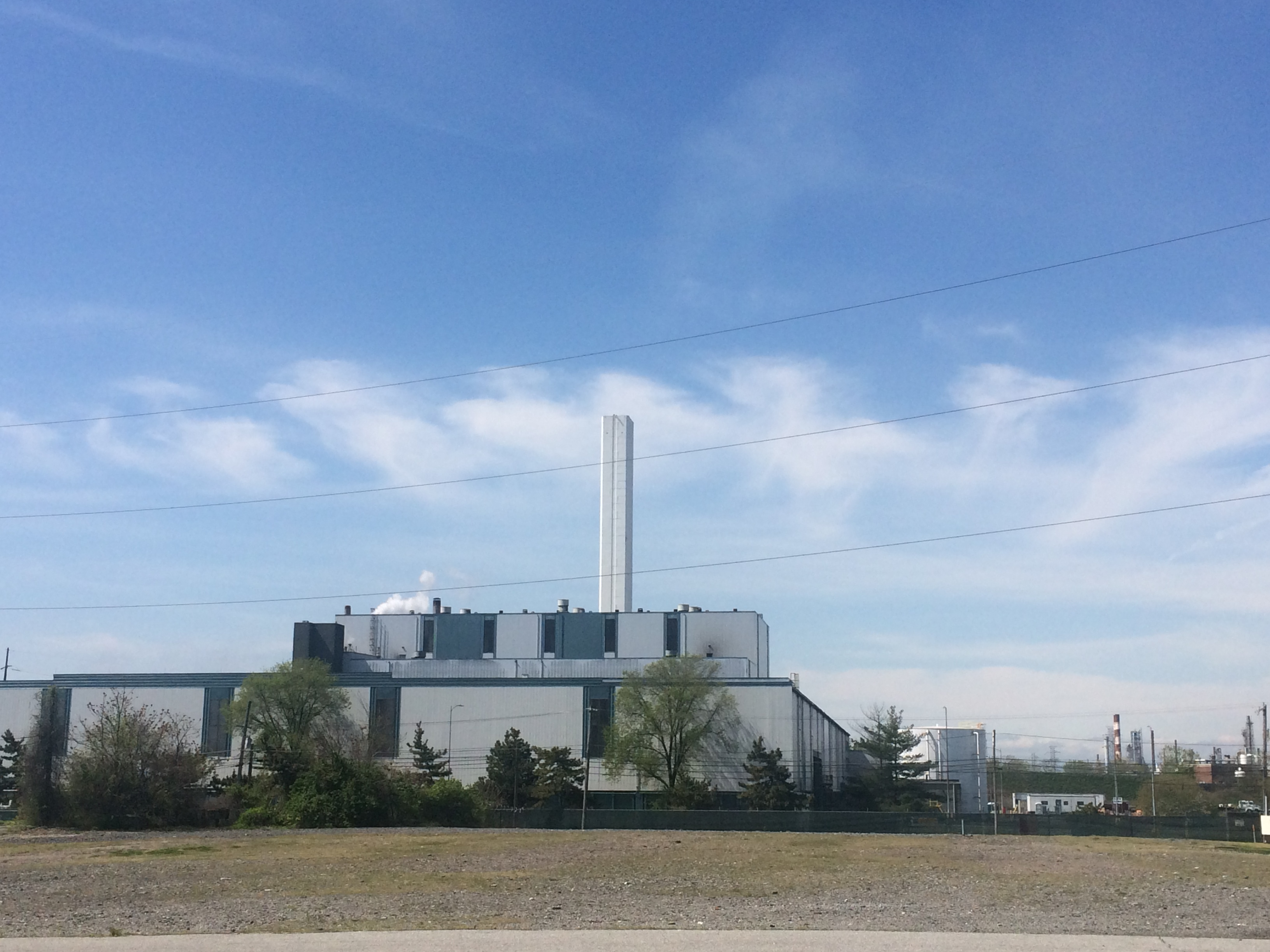
- Country: United States
- Location: Chester, Pennsylvania
- Coordinates: 39.82632°N 75.38842°W
- Status: Operational
- Commission date: 1991
- Owner: Reworld
- Operator: Reworld

Thermal power station
- Primary fuel: Municipal waste
- Turbine technology: Incineration

The Delaware Valley Resource Recovery Facility is a trash incineration plant located in Chester, Pennsylvania. The waste-to-energy plant, which incinerates waste to generate power, was built and operated by Westinghouse from 1991 to 1997. It is currently operated by Reworld. a Morristown, New Jersey–based publicly traded industrial waste company, and has been criticized for the level of pollution it produces. The plant has the largest capacity of any waste-to-energy plant in the United States.

== Description ==
The Delaware Valley Resource Recovery Facility was built in 1991 by Westinghouse Corporation and operated by the firm until 1997. It has been operated by Covanta since 2005, first leasing and later buying the facility from GE Energy Financial Services for $94 million in 2012. The plant is one of the largest trash incineration plants in the United States and has the greatest maximum daily burning capacity (3,510 tons) of any plant in the country. The facility contains six rotary combustors feeding a 90 megawatt turbine generator. The facility is provided water by the Delaware County Regional Water Authority (DELCORA) and funnels its wastewater to a DELCORA treatment plant adjacent to the recovery center's property.

The facility intakes municipal waste from several cities on the East Coast, including nearby Philadelphia, New York City, and cities in New Jersey. The plant's intake increased after the China waste import ban began in early 2018.

According to Covanta, the facility has a waste processing capacity of 3,500 tons per day with a maximum power output of 87 megawatts.

== History ==
In 1988, the mayor of Chester, Willie Mae James Leake, and her administration developed plans to build a large trash incinerator able to handle 4,000 tons of trash a day. Meanwhile, Delaware County officials contracted with the Westinghouse Corporation to develop a more modestly sized incinerator in Chester.

While Chester officials argued that their plans for a trash incinerator were safer for residents than the one planned by Delaware County, there was also a major difference in finances where the Chester developed plant would have meant $34 million in profit for the city, while the Delaware County developed plant would only provide $2 million annually.

A major public confrontation occurred between proponents of the city and county plans on April 27, 1988, at a public hearing sponsored by the Pennsylvania Department of Environmental Resources (DER). Hundreds of angry Chester residents gathered in the Chester High School auditorium along with Leake and Pennsylvania representative Robert C. Wright.

On October 25, 1988, Chester city council signed an agreement to allow the development of the county sponsored Westinghouse trash incinerator plant in Chester with Leake abstaining. The groundbreaking for the new incinerator plant occurred on December 15, 1988. The plant opened in the summer of 1991 and was operated by Westinghouse until 1997.

The subsequent mayor of Chester, Barbara Bohannan-Sheppard, led efforts seeking environmental justice for the residents of Chester. She coordinated a town meeting of Chester residents, government officials, industry representatives, Environmental Protection Agency representatives and Pennsylvania Department of Environmental Protection representatives to raise concerns about pollution, noise and trucks associated with the placement of the Westinghouse Corporation trash incinerator in Chester. Bohannan-Sheppard argued that the addition of a contaminated soil remediation facility along with the Westinghouse trash incinerator, the DELCORA sewage waste treatment center and the Abbonizio Recycling facility resulted in "environmental apartheid" for the residents of majority African-American Chester.

== Pollution ==
The Delaware Valley Resource Recovery Facility has been criticized for emitting relatively high levels of pollution; several sources name the plant as one of the most polluting waste-to-energy facilities in the United States. A report published by PBS on the Chester facility compared the facility to other plants owned by Covanta and concluded that the facility was one of the dirtiest operated by the company. The PBS report also cited a 2009 inspection of the plant by the EPA to conclude that Covanta had not installed mercury and NOx control systems at the Chester facility.

Data released by the EPA in 2014 indicated that the plant produced more NOx and SO2 than any other waste-to-energy plant in the state of Pennsylvania, only being surpassed in emissions by aging coal power plants.

== See also ==
- List of power stations in Pennsylvania
