= George Raymond =

American civil rights leader (1914–1999)

- Born: May 10, 1914; Chester, Pennsylvania, U.S.
- Died: May 9, 1999 (aged 84)
- Resting place: Haven Cemetery, Chester, Pennsylvania, U.S.
- Occupations: President of the Chester, Pennsylvania, branch of the NAACP

George T. Raymond (May 10, 1914 – May 9, 1999) was an American civil rights leader from Pennsylvania who served as president of the Chester, Pennsylvania, branch of the National Association for the Advancement of Colored People (NAACP) from 1942 to 1977. He was integral in the desegregation of businesses, public housing and schools in Chester and co-led the Chester school protests in 1964 which made Chester a key battleground in the civil rights movement.

== Early life and education ==
Raymond was born in Chester, Pennsylvania, and graduated from Chester High School in 1933. He studied business administration at Drexel Institute of Technology for one year but economic hardship forced him to leave school and find work.

Raymond worked at multiple odd jobs and finally landed at the Chester Boys Club, joined the NAACP and began his career in the civil rights movement.

== Career ==
Raymond became the leader of the Chester branch of the NAACP in 1942 and began to implement programs to end racial discrimination. He partnered with J. Pius Barbour, the pastor of Calvary Baptist Church in Chester and together they adopted a gradualist approach to civil rights.

In 1945, Raymond and the Chester branch of the NAACP successfully desegregated movie theaters, restaurants, hotels and other businesses in Chester through non-violent protests and the threat of legal action.

In 1953, the United States Supreme Court rendered its decision in the case Brown v. Board of Education of Topeka declaring state laws establishing separate schools for black and white students to be unconstitutional. The Chester Board of Education technically met the requirements of integration, however Board policy allowed students to request transfers to schools outside their neighborhood. The Board approved most transfers for white students but few for black students. As a result, in 1953, five elementary schools in Chester were almost completely black. However, each of those five schools had white students living within its district that were allowed to attend all-white schools in other parts of town.

In 1955, Raymond and the NAACP desegregated public housing run by the Chester Housing Authority.

In 1958, Raymond purchased a house in the borough of Rutledge, Pennsylvania, in majority white Delaware County. The day before he was to move in, a fire burned down the house. After the fire, the township attempted to exercise eminent domain and claim Raymond's property as a site for a new town hall. Raymond threatened legal action and the township backed down. The house was rebuilt and Raymond took residence in the house in 1959.

In 1964, the Chester school protests led to a month long series of almost nightly protests initiated by Stanley Branche and the Committee for Freedom Now against the Chester School Board de facto segregation of schools. The protests were marked by violence and police brutality which caused James Farmer to dub Chester the “Birmingham of the North,” in reference to the harsh treatment of protesters in Birmingham, Alabama, around the same time. Raymond presented the school board with a list of 10 demands including teacher transfers, transportation of students to schools in other neighborhoods, hiring blacks for supervisory positions and hiring more black secretaries. Over six hundred people were arrested over a two-month period of civil rights rallies, marches, pickets, boycotts and sit-ins.

== Death and legacy ==
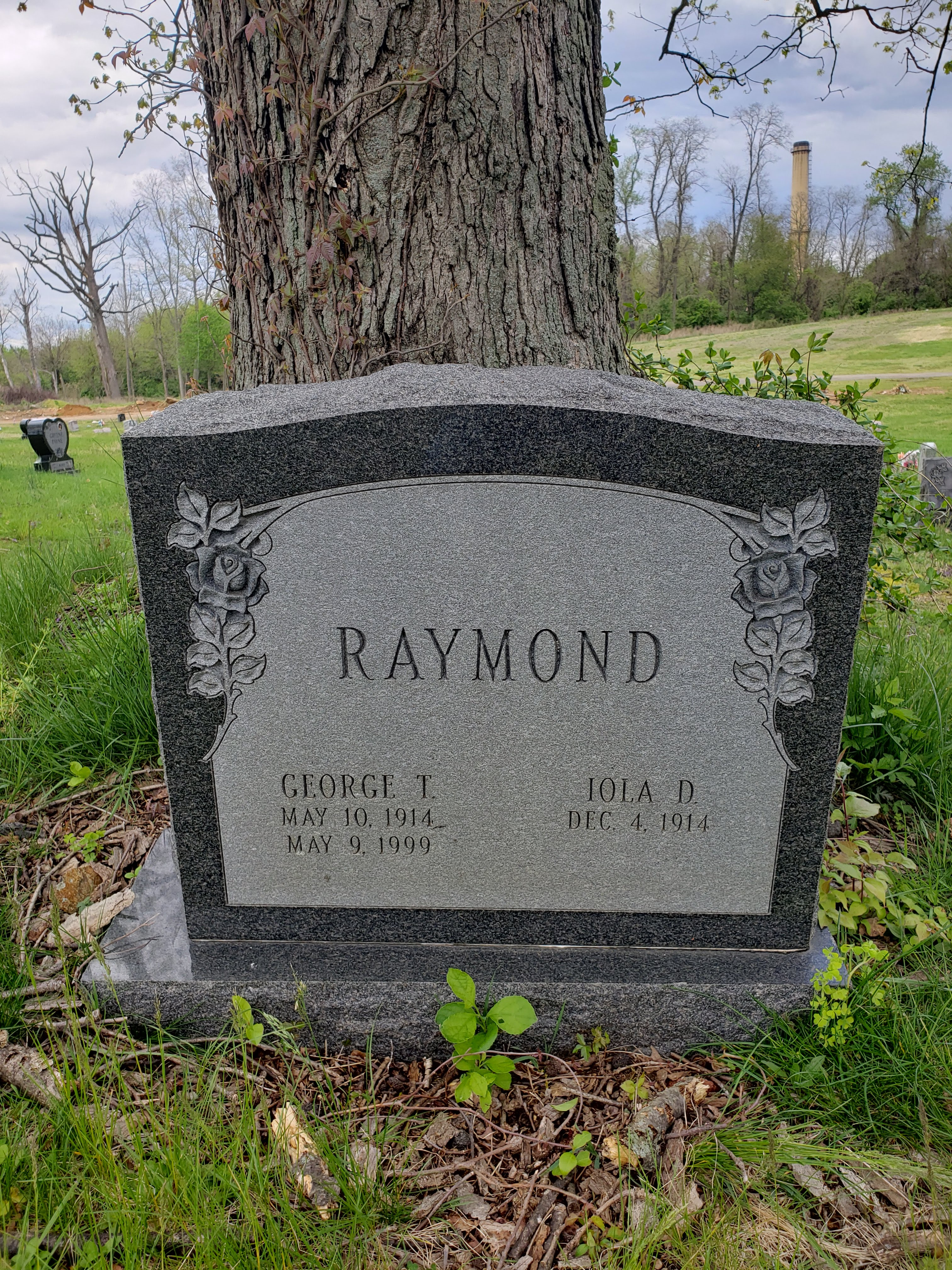
George Raymond Gravestone in Haven Memorial Cemetery

Raymond died of heart failure on May 9, 1999, and was interred at Haven Memorial Cemetery.

Raymond was presented the Freedom Award by Supreme Court Justice Thurgood Marshall.

In 1991, the George T. Raymond award was established in his honor by the NAACP.

Three scrapbooks created by Raymond of newspaper clippings, booklets and photographs chronicling the Chester civil rights movement throughout the 1940s, 1950s and 1960s are available online at the Wolfman Digital Collections at Widener University.
