= Calvary Baptist Church (Chester, Pennsylvania) =

Baptist church in Pennsylvania

Coordinates: 39.837347°N 75.378145°W

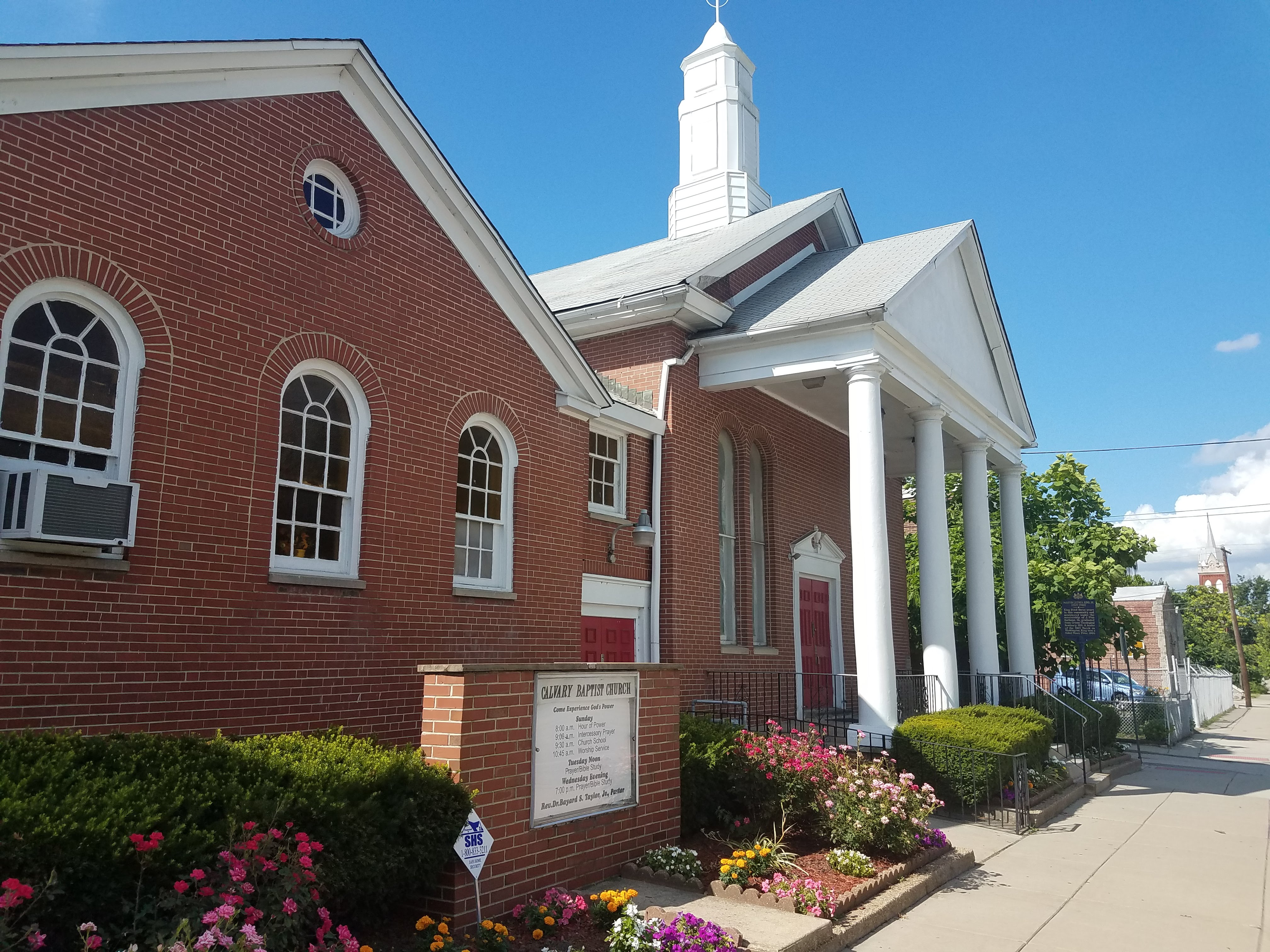
Calvary Baptist Church in 2018

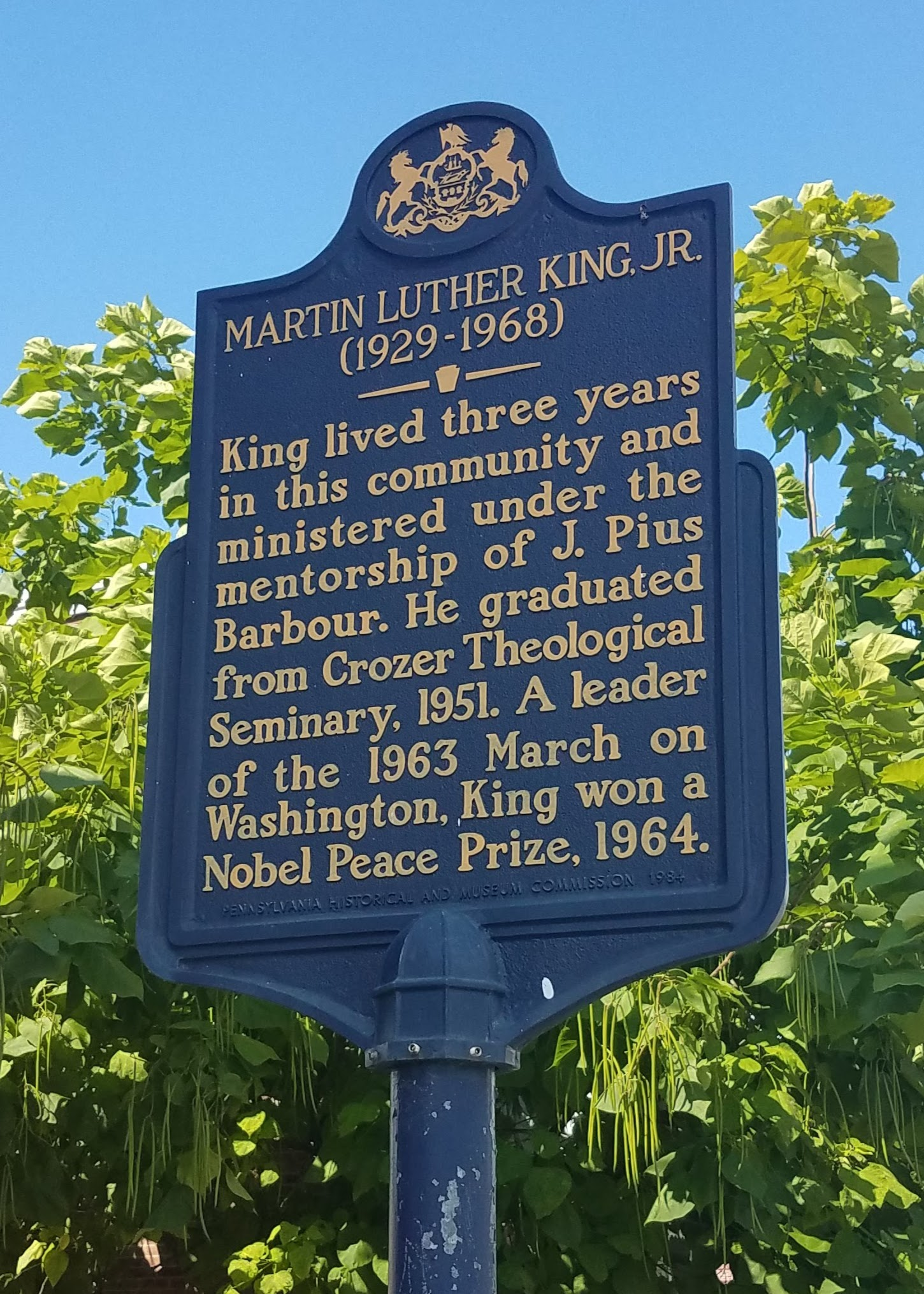
Pennsylvania historical marker in front of Calvary Baptist Church

Calvary Baptist Church is a Baptist Church founded in 1879 in Chester, Delaware County, Pennsylvania, United States. It is affiliated with the Progressive National Baptist Convention, and the American Baptist Churches, USA.

Martin Luther King Jr. attended and worked with Calvary Baptist Church while he studied at the Crozer Theological Seminary from 1948 to 1951.

== History ==
Calvary Baptist Church was organized in 1879 by a small group of freed slaves who migrated from Louisa County, Virginia. The church began as prayer services held in the home of Mr. and Mrs. Basil Thompson in 1875.

On August 10, 1897, a church building at Second and Baker Streets was dedicated. The church was built with funding from Samuel A. Crozer, brother of the wealthy textile manufacturer John Price Crozer.

Martin Luther King Jr. attended Calvary Baptist Church while studying at Crozer Theological Seminary from 1948 to 1951. King's father had reached out to the pastor of Calvary Baptist, J. Pius Barbour who agreed to take King Jr. under his care and to monitor his studies and activities at Crozer. King became known as one of the "Sons of Calvary", a distinction he shared with William Augustus Jones, Jr. and Samuel D. Proctor. King served as a Sunday School teacher and youth minister at Calvary Baptist and the church became his home away from home. King was a frequent guest at the Barbour house for the southern cooking but also the academic debates and challenging ideas. King and Barbour became "like father and son" and King's biographer, Lawrence D. Reddick, stated that Dr. King credited J. Pius Barbour as one of the single most influential forces in his life.

In the mid-1950s, the church was expanded through the purchase and razing of nearby homes. A new chapel, Sunday School rooms and social activity areas were added.

In 1959, the civil rights leader Muhammad Kenyatta, born Donald Jackson, was ordained a minister at the age of 14 at Calvary Baptist Church.

=== Pastors ===
- Rev. Samuel Christian
- Joshua A. Brockett
- Rev. W.R. Burrill
- Rev. John W. Thompson - 1893 to 1901
- Rev. Milton Sparks
- Rev. A.R. Robinson
- Rev. Alexander Gordon
- Rev. Joshua W. Moore
- Rev. J.R. Bennett - husband of Ruth L. Bennett
- Rev. Ernest B. Morris - 1921 to 1932
- Rev. Dr. J. Pius Barbour - 1934 to 1974
- Rev. Dr. Wallace Smith
- Rev. Kirk Byron Jones
- Rev. Tommie Jackson - 1990 to 1997
- Rev. Dr. Bayard S. Taylor, Jr. - June 2000 to present
