= Committee for Freedom Now =

American civil rights organization

Committee for Freedom Now (CFFN)
- Founded: 1963
- Founder: Stanley Branche
- Type: Civil rights organization
- Purpose: Desegregation of Chester public schools
- Location: Chester, Pennsylvania

The Committee for Freedom Now (CFFN) was an American civil rights organization in Chester, Pennsylvania, that worked to end de facto segregation and improve the conditions at predominantly black schools in Chester. CFFN was founded in 1963 by Stanley Branche along with the Swarthmore College chapter of Students for a Democratic Society and Chester parents. From November 1963 to April 1964, CFFN and the Chester chapter of the NAACP, led by George Raymond, initiated the Chester school protests which made Chester a key battleground in the civil rights movement.

== History ==
Stanley Branche was a civil right activist from Chester, Pennsylvania. He participated in the Cambridge movement in Dorchester County, Maryland, and returned to Chester in 1962. He became the executive director of the Chester branch of the NAACP and partnered with George Raymond to desegregate businesses and improve minority hiring practices.

By the fall of 1963, Branche became frustrated with the gradualist approach of Raymond and the NAACP. He resigned and created a new activist organization named the Committee for Freedom Now (CFFN) along with the Swarthmore College chapter of the Students for a Democratic Society and Chester parents to end de facto segregation of public schools and improve conditions at predominantly black schools in Chester.

== Chester school protests ==
CFFN and NAACP partnered to lead the Chester school protests - a series of demonstrations that occurred in Chester from November 1963 through April 1964. The demonstrations focused on ending the de facto segregation that resulted in the racial categorization of Chester public schools, even after the landmark Supreme Court case Brown v. The Board of Education of Topeka. In 1962, CFFN focused on improving conditions at the predominantly black Franklin Elementary school in Chester. Although the school was built to house 500 students, it had become overcrowded with 1,200 students. The school's average class-size was 39, twice the number of nearby all-white schools. The school was built in 1910 and had never been updated. Only two bathrooms were available for the entire school.

In November 1963, CFFN protesters blocked the entrance to Franklin Elementary school and the Chester Municipal Building which resulted in the arrest of 240 protesters. Following public attention to the protests stoked by media coverage of the mass arrests, the mayor and school board negotiated with CFFN and NAACP. The Chester Board of Education agreed to reduce class sizes at Franklin school, remove unsanitary toilet facilities, relocate classes held in the boiler room and coal bin and repair school grounds.

Emboldened by the success of the Franklin Elementary school demonstrations, CFFN recruited new members, sponsored voter registration drives and planned a citywide boycott of Chester schools. CFFN expanded their organization goals to include better public schools in all of Chester, an increase in employment, better healthcare and an end to racial discrimination. CFFN organized block groups in African-American neighborhoods. CFFN built close ties with students at Swarthmore College, Pennsylvania Military College and Cheyney State College in order to ensure large turnouts at demonstrations and protests. In March 1964, CFFN hosted the "Freedom Now Conference" in Chester and national civil rights leaders such as Dick Gregory and Malcolm X participated. Other national civil rights leaders such as Gloria Richardson came to Chester in support of the demonstrations.

In March and April 1964, huge protests over multiple days ensued which resulted in mass arrests of protesters. The mayor of Chester, James Gorbey, issued "The Police Position to Preserve the Public Peace", a ten-point statement promising an immediate return to law and order. The city deputized firemen and trash collectors to help handle demonstrators. The State of Pennsylvania deployed 50 state troopers to assist the 77-member Chester police force. The demonstrations were marked by violence and charges of police brutality. Over six hundred people were arrested over a two-month period of civil rights rallies, marches, pickets, boycotts and sit-ins.

Branche from CFFN acted as press spokesman, community liaison, recruiter and chief negotiator. Governor William Scranton convinced Branche to obey a court-ordered moratorium on demonstrations.

== Impact ==
Governor Scranton created the Pennsylvania Human Relations Commission to conduct hearings on the de facto segregation of public schools. All protests were discontinued while the commission held hearings during the summer of 1964. In November 1964, the Pennsylvania Human Relations Commission concluded that the Chester School Board had violated the law and ordered Chester School District to desegregate the city's six predominantly African-American schools. The city appealed the ruling, and in February 1966, the Pennsylvania Commonwealth Court nullified the authority of the Pennsylvania Human Relations Commission to rule on Chester's de facto segregation of schools. CFFN joined with CORE and petitioned the U.S. Department of Health, Education and Welfare to cut off federal funding for Chester schools due to violations of Title III of the Civil Rights Act of 1964. Despite the delay in implementation, the schools were eventually desegregated.

In June 1964, Chester city leaders formed the Greater Chester Movement (GCM), an umbrella organization intended to coordinate activities of groups working toward the improvement of Chester. When President Lyndon B. Johnson initiated his War on Poverty, the GCM became a conduit through which federal dollars were distributed in Chester. The GCM was formally connected with CFFN and other groups in Chester including the local branches of the NAACP and CORE.
