= Lawrence D. Reddick =

American historian

- Born: March 3, 1910; Jacksonville, Florida
- Died: August 2, 1995 (aged 85); New Orleans, Louisiana
- Occupation: Historian

Lawrence Dunbar Reddick (March 3, 1910 – August 2, 1995) was an African-American historian and professor who wrote the first biography of Martin Luther King Jr., strengthened major archives of African-American history resources at Atlanta University Center and the New York Public Library, and was fired by Alabama's state board of education for his support for student sit-ins at Alabama State College—an event that earned him honor for his courage and brought Alabama State College censure by the American Association of University Professors.

== Life and career ==
Born March 3, 1910, in Jacksonville, Florida, Reddick earned his bachelor's and master's degrees in history from Fisk University in Nashville, Tennessee, completing his work there in 1933. He was initiated into the Alpha Gamma chapter of Phi Beta Sigma while at Fisk University. In 1939, he married Ella Ruth Thomas and received his Ph.D. in history from the University of Chicago, where he wrote his dissertation on The Negro in the New Orleans Press, 1850-1860. As a student, he took classes with Avery Craven, whom Reddick criticized for not considering the perspectives of Black southerners on the Civil War and Reconstruction. During the years he was working on his Ph.D., he directed a Works Project Administration collection of interviews of former slaves in Kentucky and Indiana; that 1934 project was based at Kentucky State College in Frankfort. He joined the faculty of Dillard University in New Orleans in 1936.

An early advocate of research on the history of all persons of African ancestry world-wide, Reddick had an opportunity to further that vision as curator of the Schomburg Center for Research in Black Culture at the New York Public Library from 1939 to 1948. Early in his tenure, he created an "honor roll" to recognize notable people and organizations working to improve race relations. Later, he worked to document the experiences of African American soldiers during World War II, whose accounts he added to the Center's archives.

Reddick subsequently took a position as head of the library at Atlanta University Center, a consortium of Atlanta colleges. In 1956, he became chair of the history department at Alabama State College in Montgomery.

== Montgomery bus boycott and M. L. King, Jr ==
Reddick began writing for Dissent about the civil rights struggle, the students sit-ins, and the 1955-1956 Montgomery bus boycott. He then was requested to work with Dr. King on his book about the successfully completed boycott, Stride Toward Freedom (1958). Later Reddick finished his own biography of King, Crusader without Violence (1959).

In 1960 the state board of education ordered Alabama State College president H. Councill Trenholm to fire Reddick as part of the board's retaliation against students and professors involved in sit-ins. For his courage and contributions to the movement, Reddick was awarded the Silver Jubilee Award by the New York City Teachers Union. The American Association of University Professors censured the Alabama college for firing him without due process; the censure lasted for twenty years.

Reddick subsequently held teaching positions at Coppin State Teachers' College in Baltimore (1960–67), Temple (1967–76), Harvard (1977–78), and Dillard (1978–87). He wrote Worth Fighting for: a History of the Negro in the United States during the Civil War and Reconstruction (with Agnes McCarthy, 1965) and Blacks and U.S. Wars (1976).

He became well-respected as a historian and a university professor and was a contributor to educational and political journals. He had expertise in media criticism, especially the effect of radio, movies, and popular culture on public perceptions of Negroes. He died on 2 August 1995 in New Orleans at age 85.

== Bibliography ==
David A. Varel, The Scholar and the Struggle: Lawrence Reddick's Crusade for Black History and Black Power (Chapel Hill: University of North Carolina Press, 2020).

David A. Varel, "Diversity Demands Struggle: Lessons from Lawrence Reddick's Crusade for Black History," Perspectives on History, January 26, 2021.

David Varel, "Those We Honor, and Those We Don't: The Case for Renaming an OAH Book Award," The American Historian, December 2020.

David A. Varel, "To Renew American Democracy, Look to Black Freedom Fighters like Lawrence Reddick," UNC Press Blog, February 3, 2021.

Wachman, M. (2005). The Education of a University President. Philadelphia: Temple University Press. p. 62
