= Chester Charter Scholars Academy =

Charter school in Pennsylvania, United States

Coordinates: 39.8388°N 75.3994°W

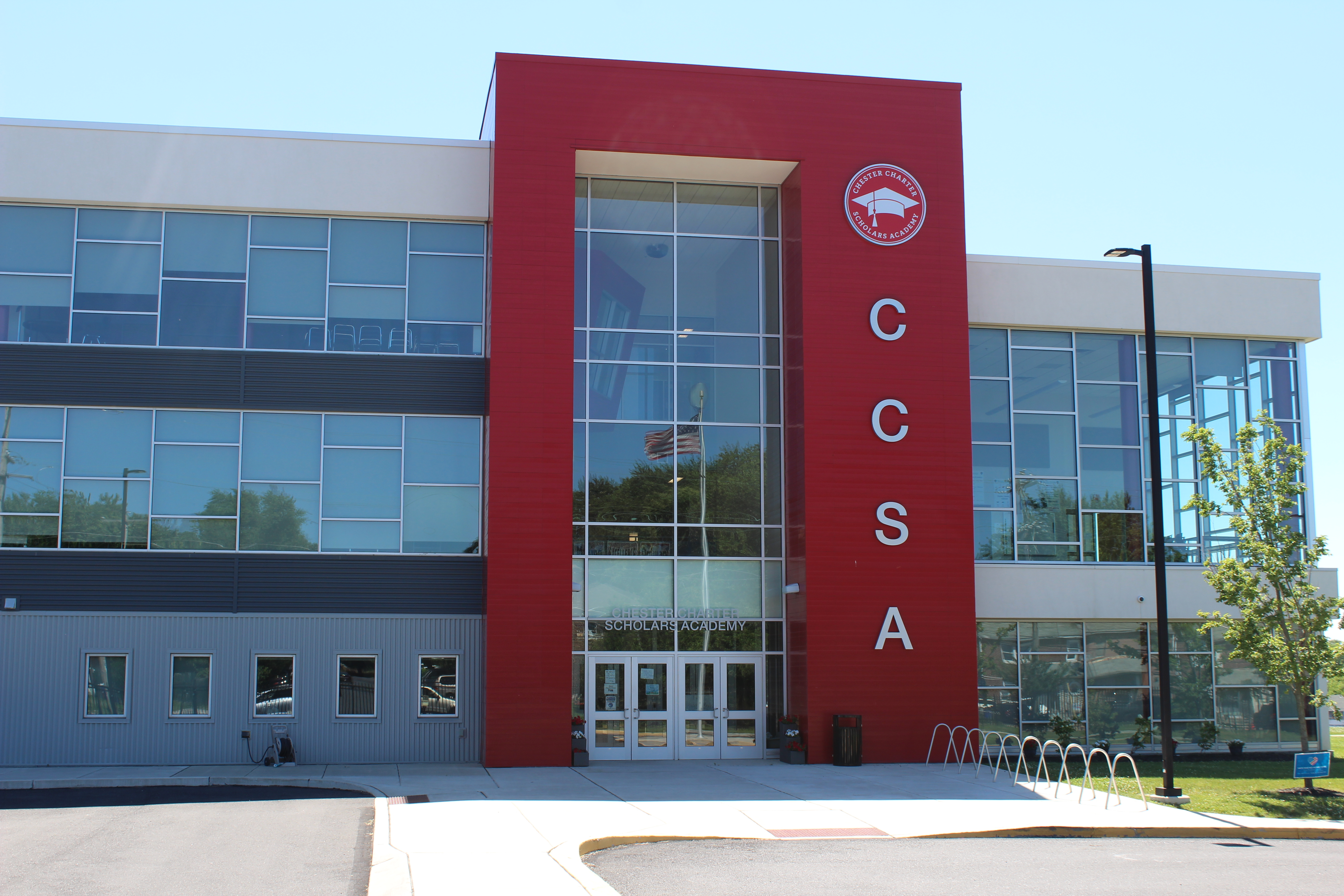
- 1500 Highland Avenue, Chester, PA, 19013

Information
- Type: Charter
- Established: 2012
- Grades: K-12
- Athletics: Basketball, Cross-country, Lacrosse, Volleyball
- Mascot: Sabers
- Information: (610) 859-3010
- Website: www.ccsascholars.org

Chester Charter Scholars Academy, formerly Chester Charter School for the Arts, (CCSA) is a public non-profit charter school in Chester, Pennsylvania, serving the Chester-Upland School District. The school currently provides kindergarten through 12th grade. The junior class will become the first senior class in 2018/2019. The educational curriculum at CCSA has a focus on music, dance, theater and visual arts.

CCSA began in 2008 as a public–private partnership between the Chester-Upland School District and the Chester Fund led by John Alston, a Swarthmore College professor and director of the Chester Children's Chorus.

The Chester Upland School for the Arts (CUSA) was opened in 2008 and became the highest performing school in the district.

In the fall of 2011, the staff at CUSA was significantly reduced due to state education funding cuts. The Chester Fund submitted a charter school application to form the Chester Charter School for the Arts.

CCSA was founded in 2012 with 325 students in Kindergarten through 6th grade. For five years, the school operated out of a rented industrial building in nearby Aston Township but outgrew the space in 2016.

The 11-acre campus at 1500 Highland Avenue in Chester was purchased in spring 2016 from the Chester Housing Authority. The property was originally part of the McCafferty Village housing development which was demolished in 1998. In August 2017, a 90,000 square foot school facility built at a cost of $25 million was opened.
