= Second Street Bridge (Chester, Pennsylvania) =

- U.S. National Register of Historic Places
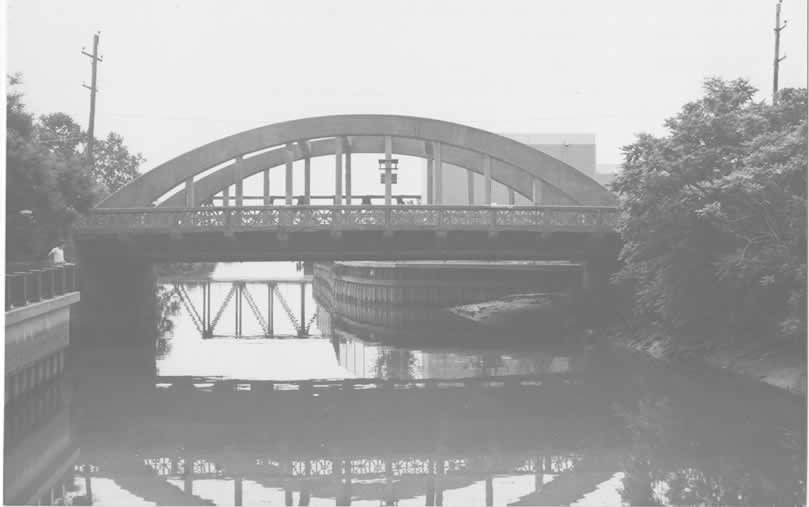
- Second Street Bridge, 1982

- Location within Pennsylvania Location within the United States
- Location: PA 291/Second St. over Chester Creek, Chester, Pennsylvania
- Coordinates: 39°50′41″N 75°21′39″W
- Area: less than one acre
- Built: 1919
- Built by: James B. Long
- Architect: Paul D. Kauffman
- Architectural style: Bowstring arch
- MPS: Highway Bridges Owned by the Commonwealth of Pennsylvania, Department of Transportation TR
- NRHP reference No.: 88000752
- Added to NRHP: June 22, 1988

The Second Street Bridge was an historic concrete Bowstring arch bridge that was located in Chester, Pennsylvania, United States.

Listed on the National Register of Historic Places in 1988, it has since been demolished.

== History and notable features ==
Built in 1919, this historic structure was an 84-foot-long (26 m), single-span, arch bridge. The original patent that was used for the bridge design was issued to James B. Marsh in 1911 and included the experimental use of concrete.

The bridge allowed traffic on Pennsylvania Route 291 to cross Chester Creek.
