= USS Chester =

Two ships of the United States Navy have been named Chester, after the city of Chester, Pennsylvania.

- USS Chester (CL-1), was a scout cruiser in service from 1908 to 1921.
- USS Chester (CA-27), was a heavy cruiser commissioned in 1930, in use throughout World War II, and decommissioned in 1946.
