= Chester, Pennsylvania =

First city in Pennsylvania, United States

- Home rule city
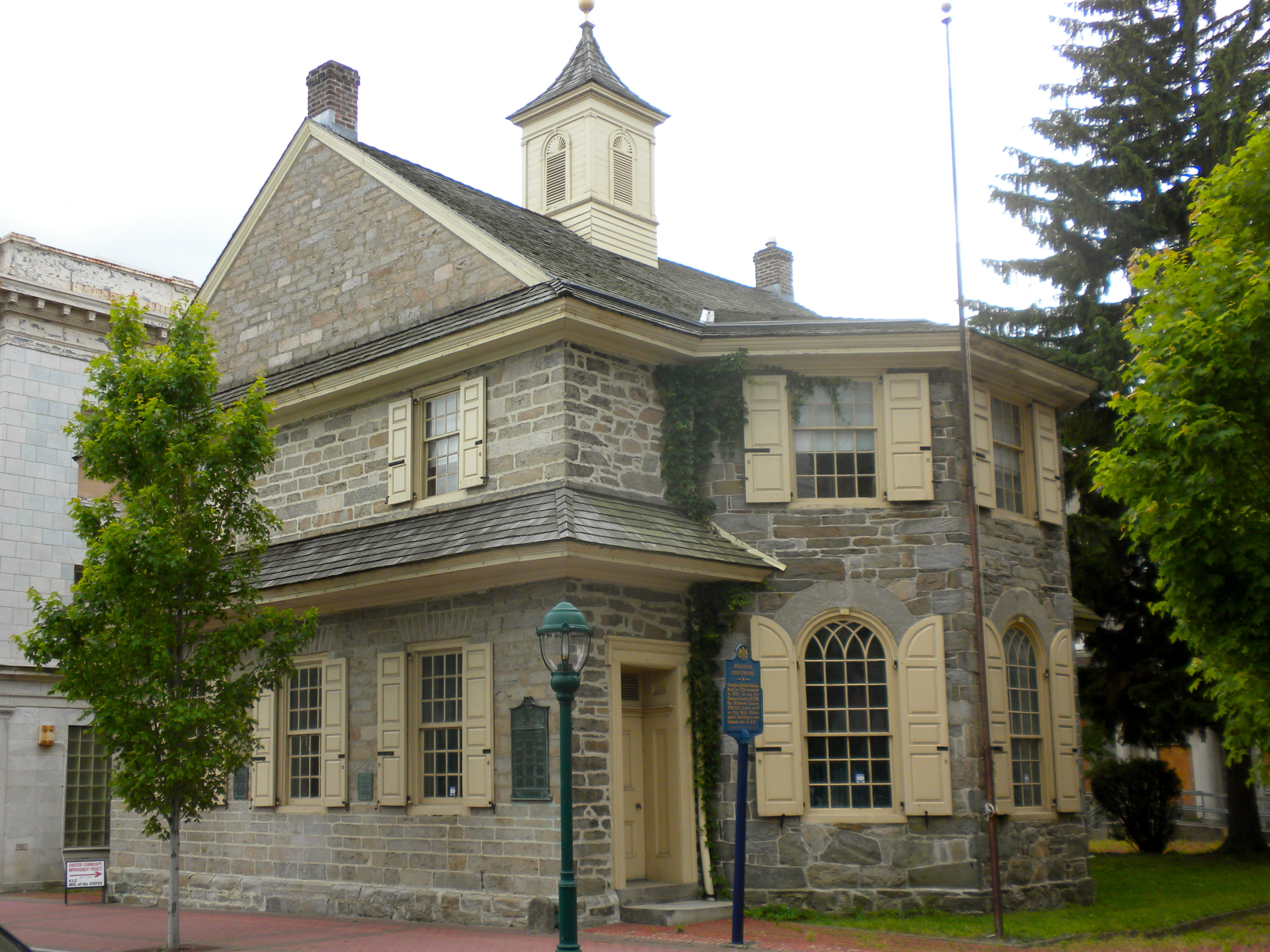
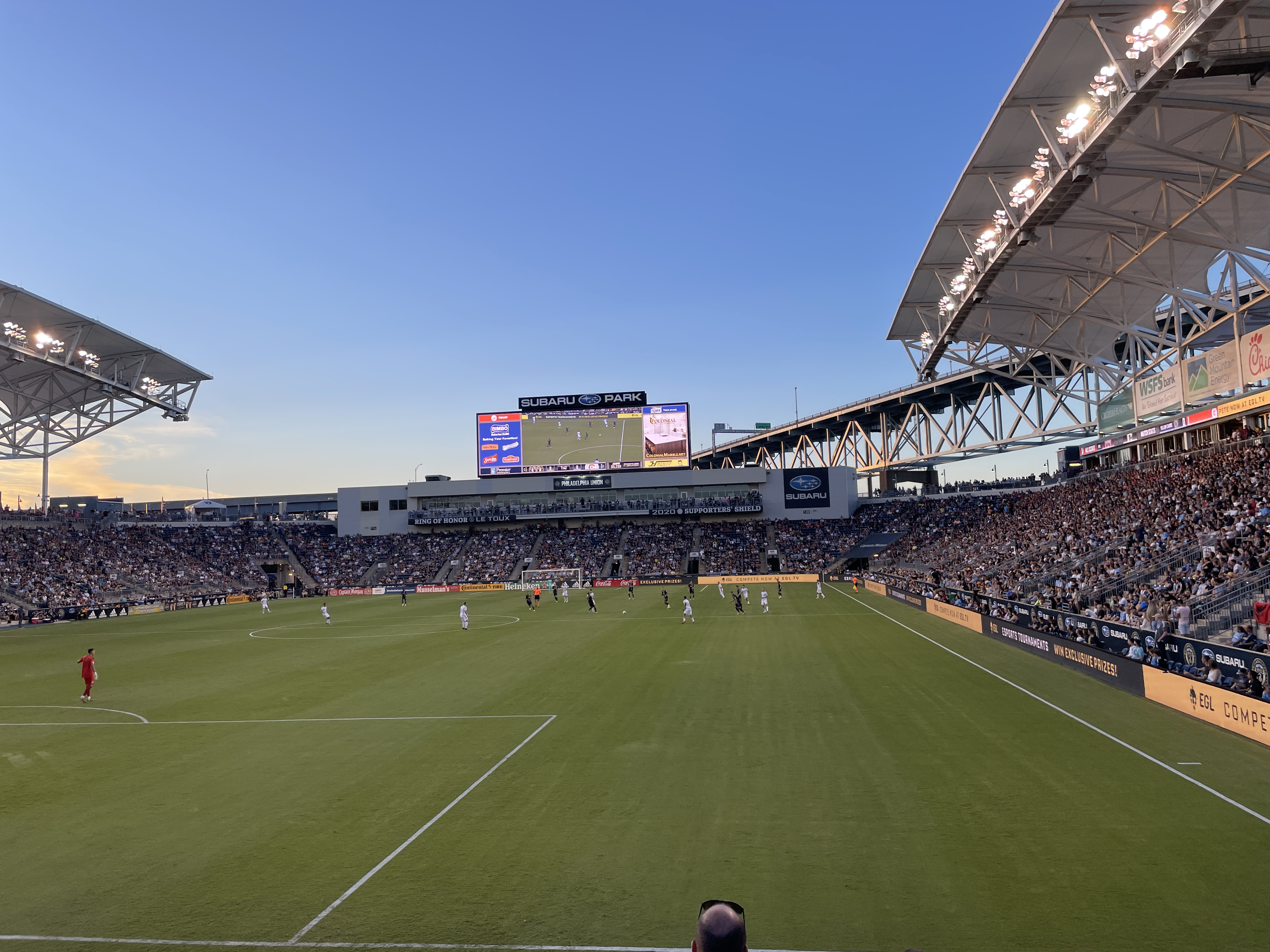
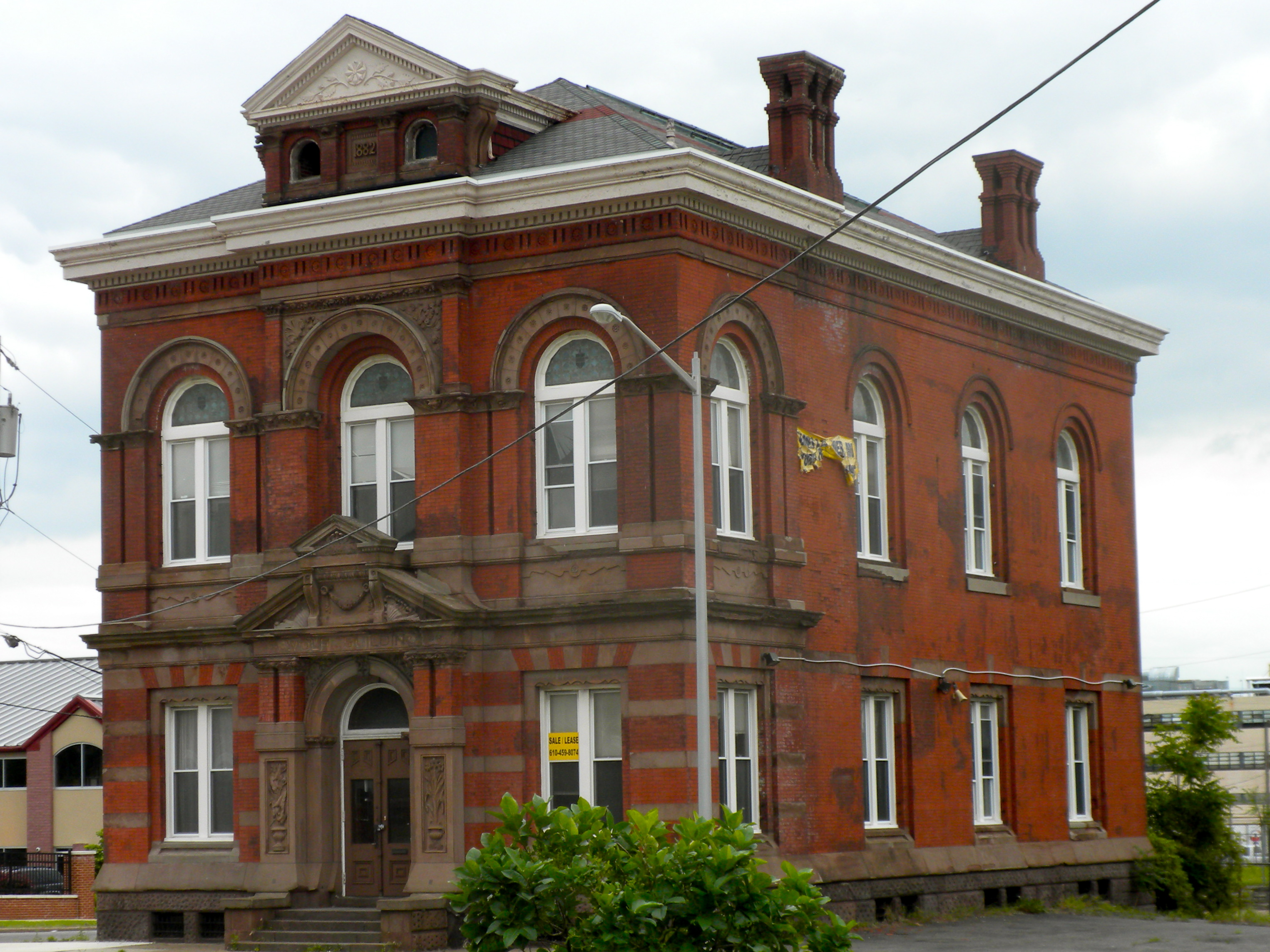
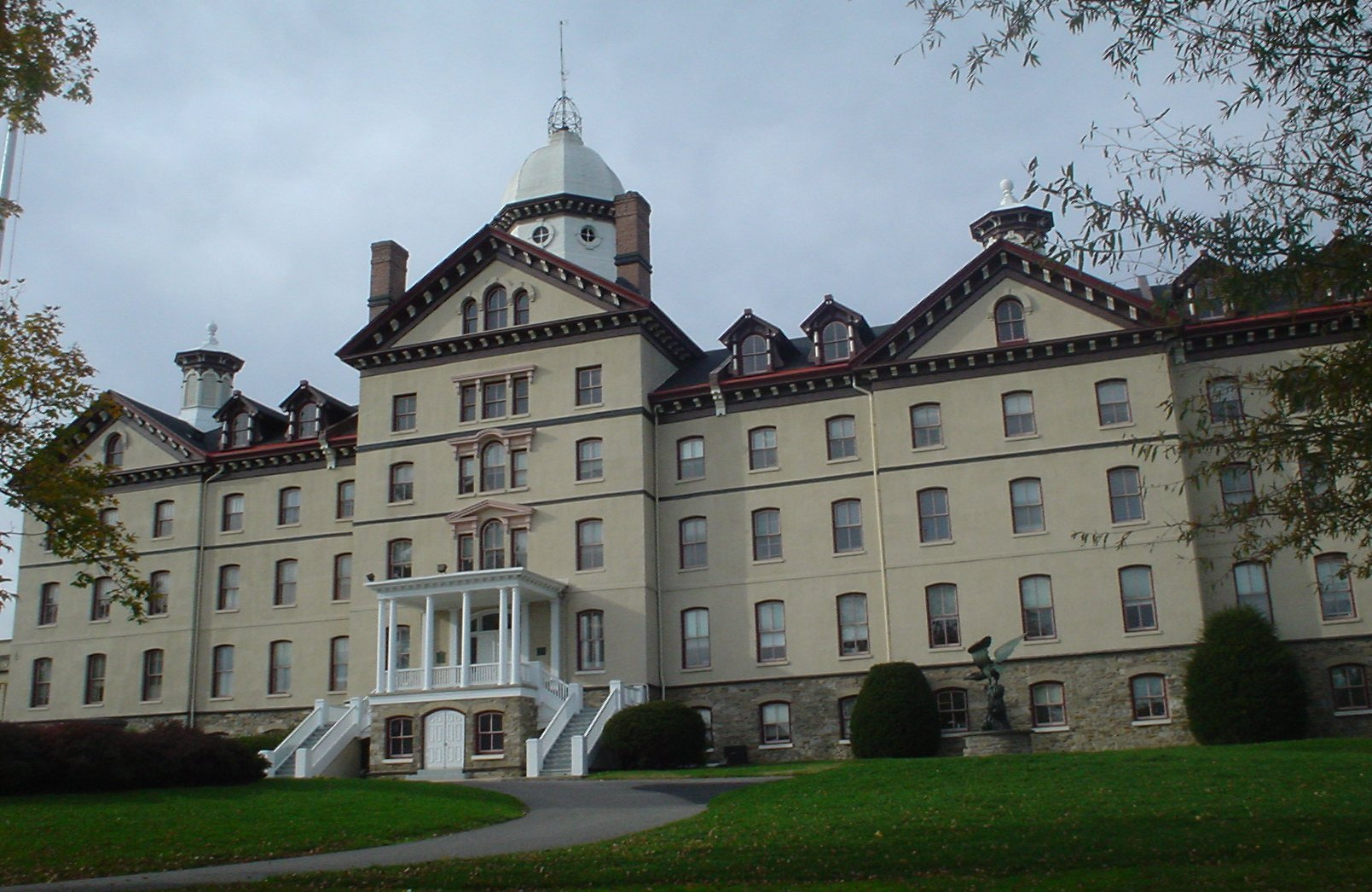
- Chester Courthouse Harrah's Philadelphia Subaru Park Delaware County National Bank Widener University

- Flag Seal
- Motto: What Chester Makes Makes Chester
- Interactive map of Chester, Pennsylvania
- Location within Pennsylvania Location within the United States
- Coordinates: 39°50′50″N 75°22′22″W
- Country: United States
- State: Pennsylvania
- County: Delaware
- Incorporated: 1682

Government
  - Mayor: Stefan Roots (D)

Area
  - Total: 6.00 sq mi (15.55 km^{2})
  - Land: 4.83 sq mi (12.52 km^{2})
  - Water: 1.17 sq mi (3.04 km^{2})
- Elevation: 69 ft (21 m)

Population (2020)
  - Total: 32,605
  - Density: 6,745.8/sq mi (2,604.57/km^{2})
- Time zone: UTC-5 (EST)
  - Summer (DST): UTC-4 (EDT)
- ZIP Code: 19013
- Area codes: 484 and 610
- FIPS code: 42-045-13208
- FIPS code: 42-13208
- GNIS feature ID: 1171694
- Website: chestercity.com

Pennsylvania Historical Marker
- Designated: October 13, 1947

Chester is a city in Delaware County, Pennsylvania, United States. It is part of the Philadelphia metropolitan area and located on the western bank of the Delaware River between Philadelphia and Wilmington, Delaware. The population of Chester was 32,605 at the 2020 census.

Incorporated in 1682, Chester is the oldest city in Pennsylvania and was the location of William Penn's first arrival in the Province of Pennsylvania. It was the county seat for Chester County from 1682 to 1788 and of Delaware County from 1789 to 1851.

From the second half of the 19th century through the first half of the 20th century, the city was a major center of heavy industry, manufacturing, and shipping. The city became a boomtown during World War I and World War II. The availability of employment in factories, dock work, and shipbuilding attracted immigrants from Southern and Eastern Europe as well as African-American migrants from southern states. Since the mid-20th century, it has lost most of its manufacturing base and has struggled as a post-industrial city dealing with crime, pollution, and poverty; however, certain manufacturing, industrial, energy production, waste treatment, and shipping centers on the Port of Chester remain active. Pennsylvania declared Chester a financially distressed municipality in 1995, and a fiscal emergency was declared in 2020. In 2022, Chester became the 31st city in the United States to declare bankruptcy.

The city is home to Widener University, Harrah's Philadelphia, the Chester Waterside Station, the William Penn Landing Site, and Subaru Park, home of the Major League Soccer team, the Philadelphia Union.

== History ==
=== Early history ===
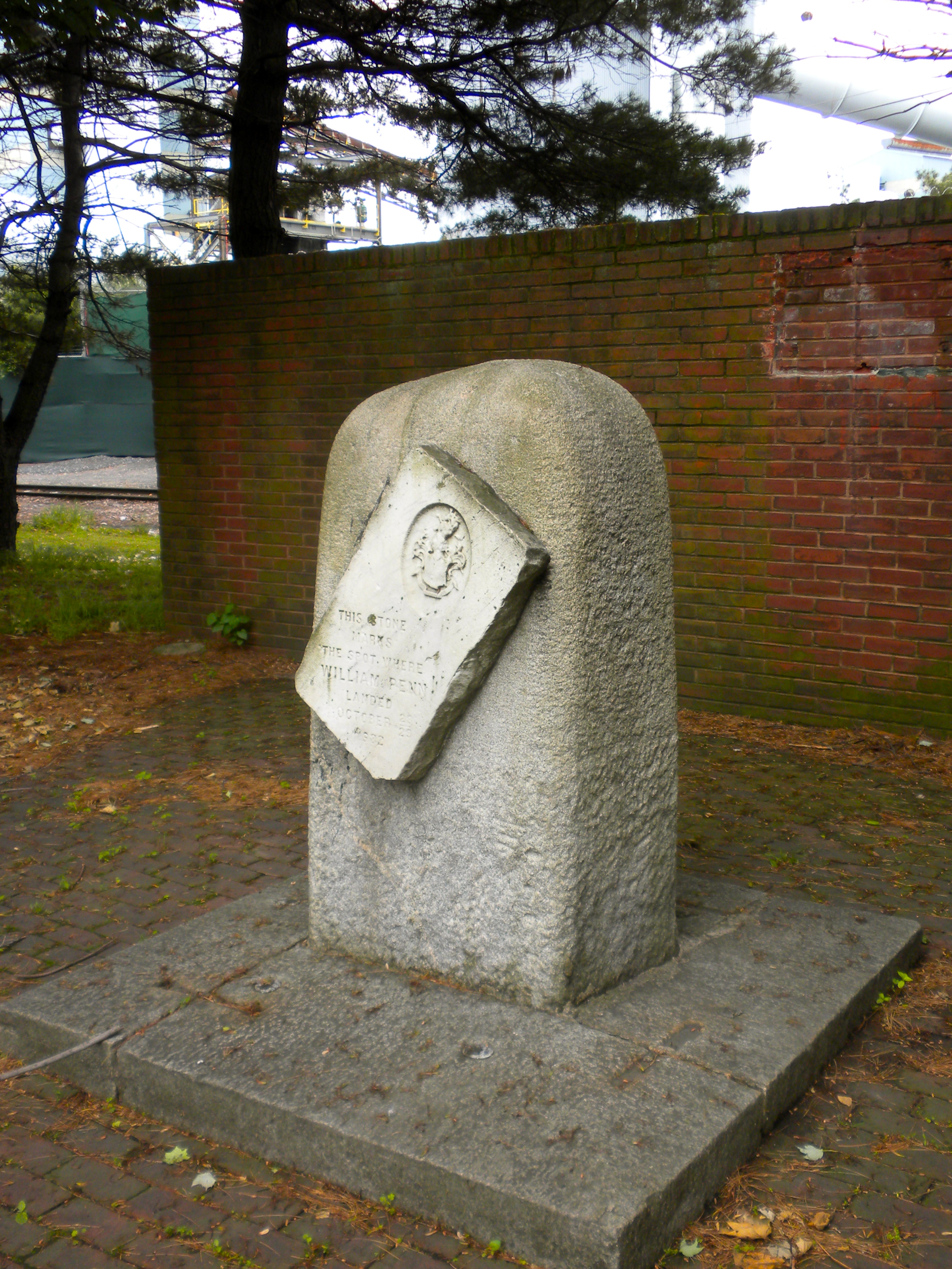
Commemorative marker at the William Penn Landing Site where William Penn first landed in the Province of Pennsylvania, in 1682

The indigenous tribe that owned the land where Chester now stands were the Okehockings, removed by order of William Penn in 1702 to other lands in Chester County. The original indigenous name of Chester was Mecoponaca, which means "the stream along which large potatoes grow".

The first European settlers in the area were members of the New Sweden colony. The settlement that became Chester was first called "Finlandia" (the Latin name for Finland) and then "Upland" after the Swedish province of Uppland. The New Sweden settlers built Fort Mecoponacka in 1641 to defend the settlement.

In 1644, the present site of Chester was a tobacco plantation operated by the New Sweden colonists.

In 1669, Marcus Jacobson attempted to rally Swedish settlers in the Revolt of the Long Swede to restore the colony to Swedish rule.

By 1682, Upland was the most populous town of the new Province of Pennsylvania. On October 27, the ship Welcome arrived bearing William Penn on his first visit to the province. Penn renamed the settlement after the English city of Chester.

=== 18th century ===
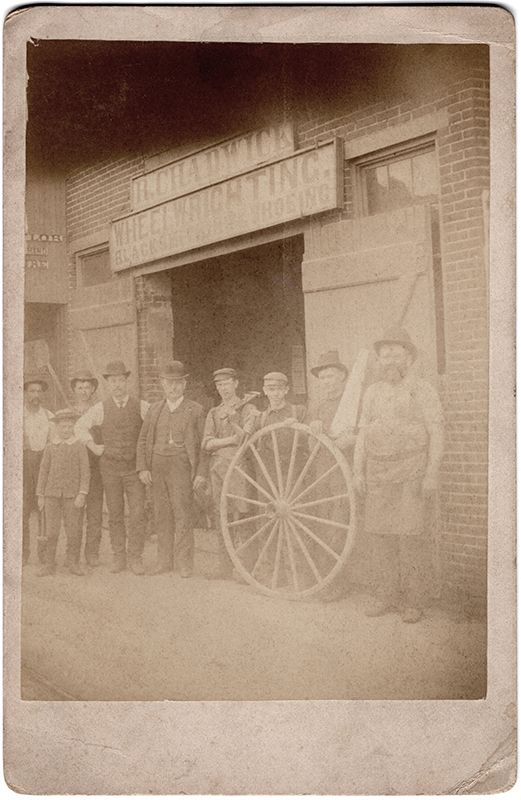
R. Chadwick Wheel Wrighting. Blacksmithing & Shoeing c.1885

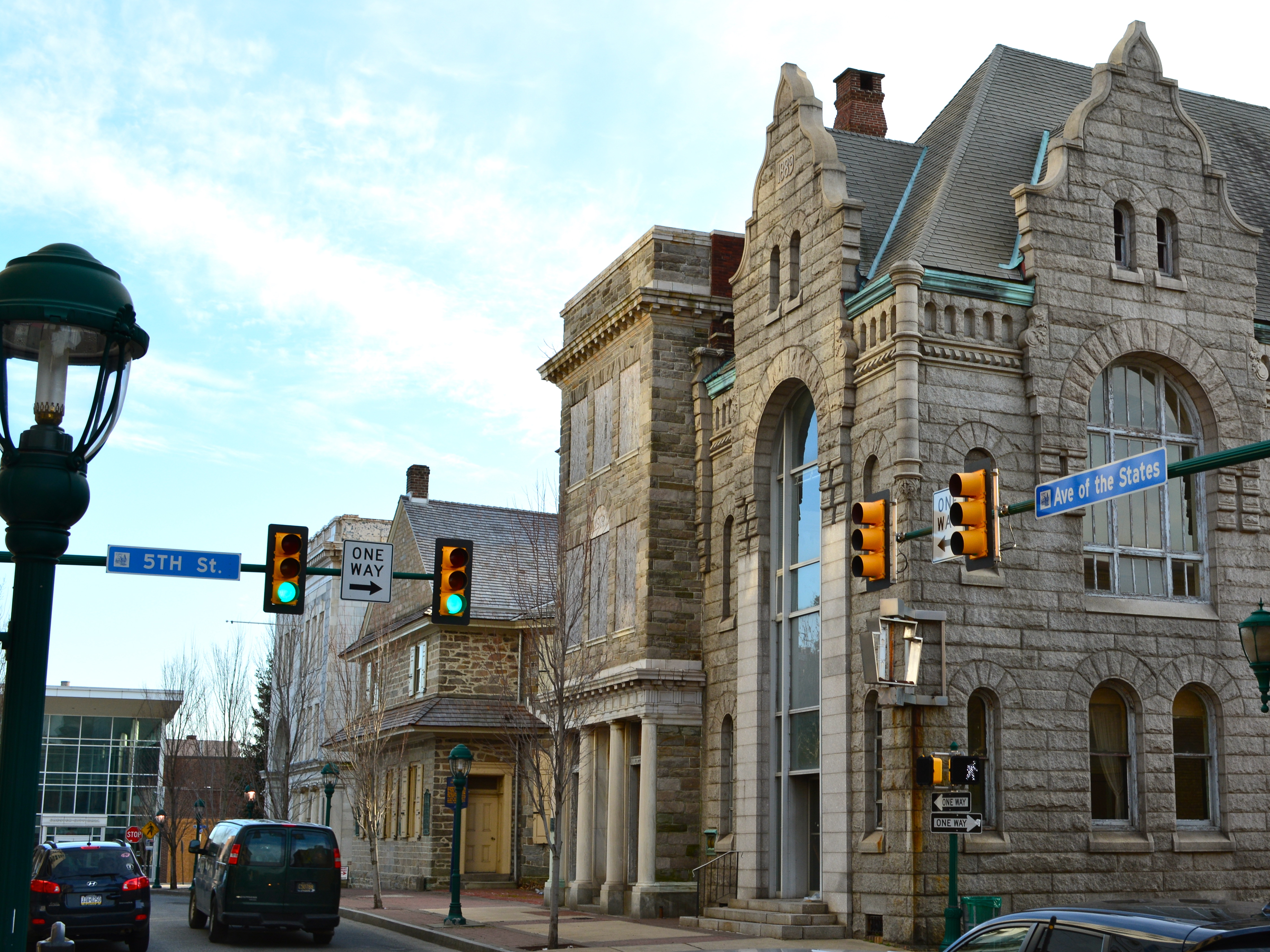
Downtown Chester at 5th Street and Avenue of the States

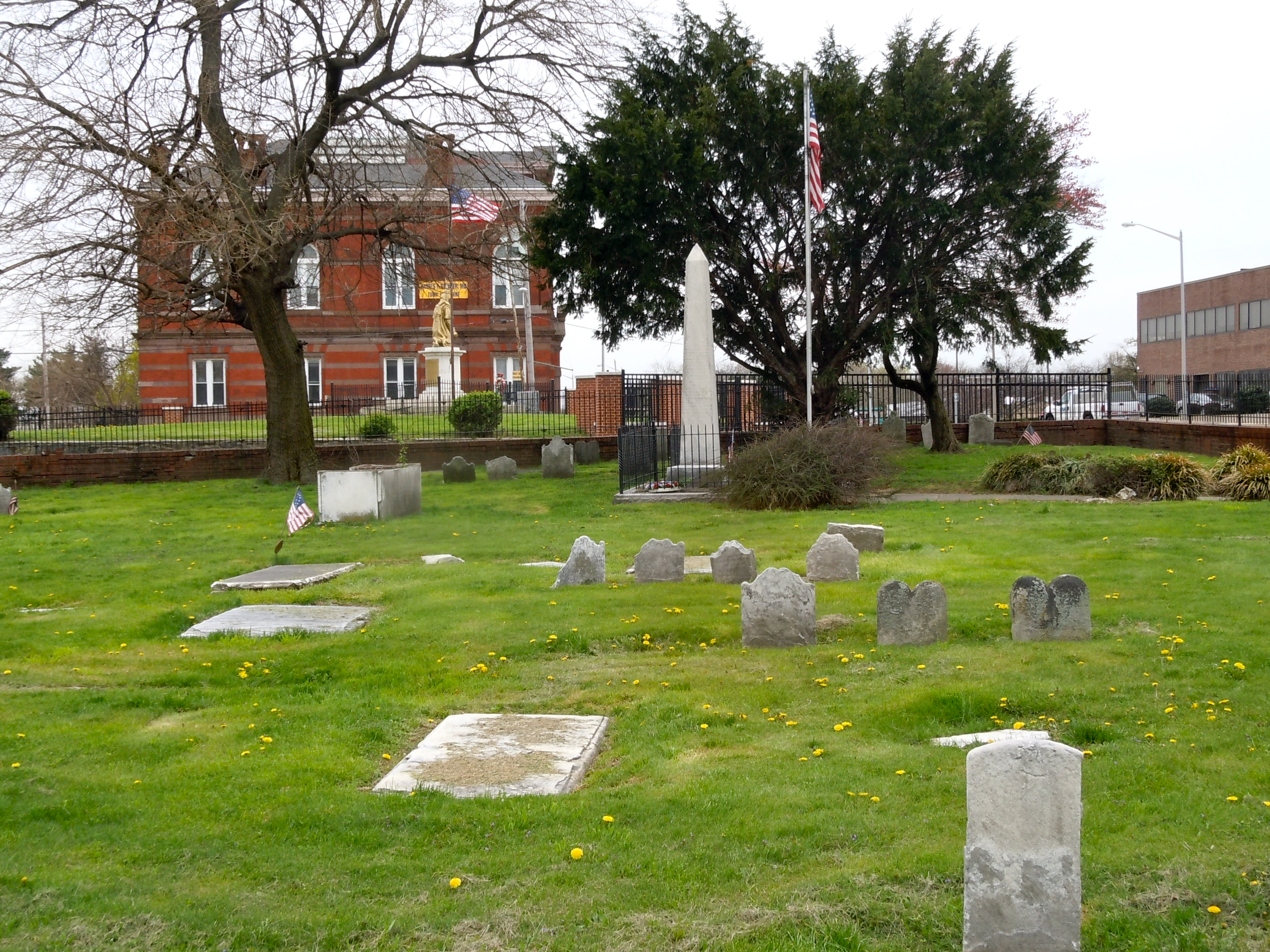
Old St. Paul's Church burial ground is the burial location of John Morton, one of 56 signators to the U.S. Declaration of Independence

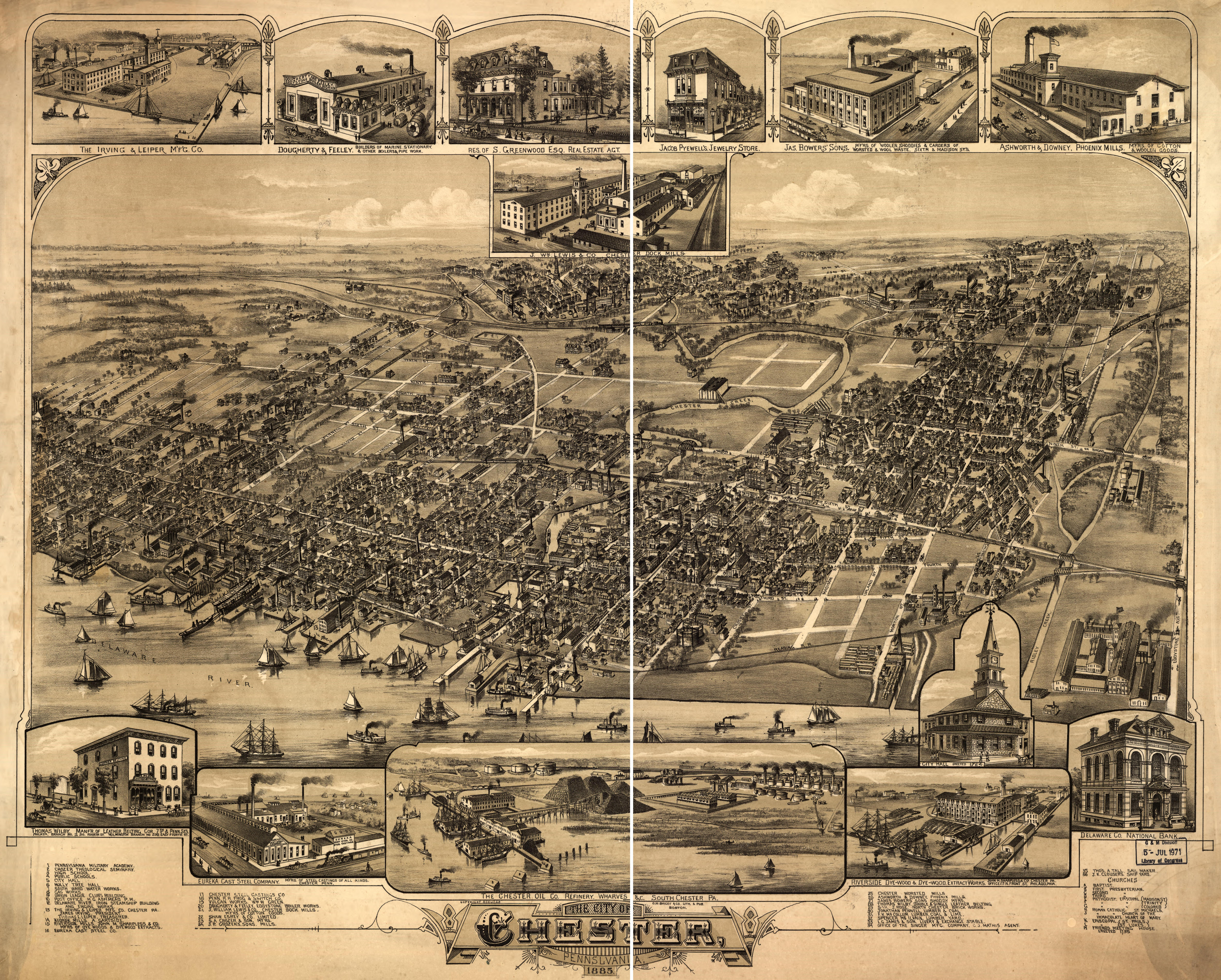
Chester in 1885

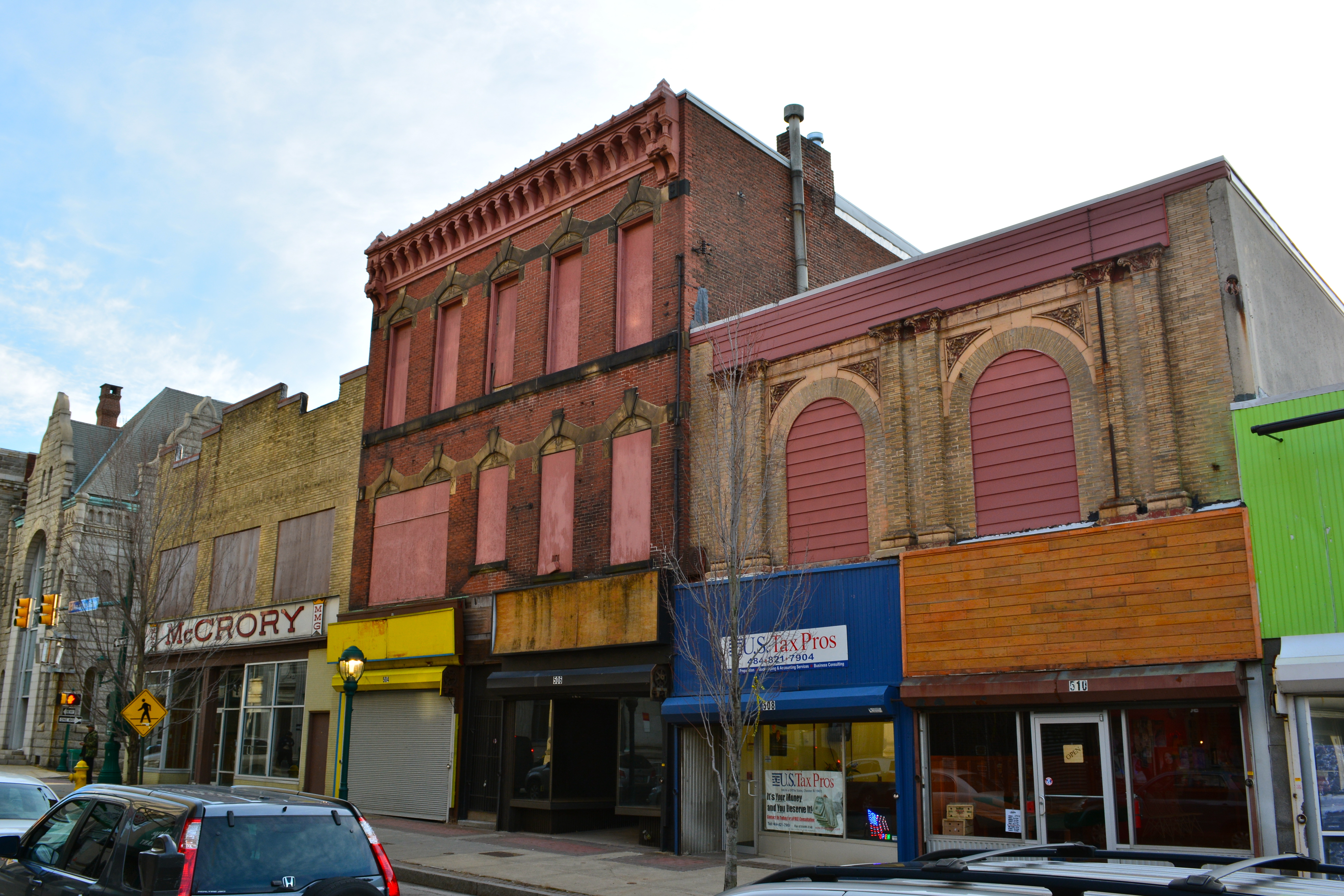
Shuttered buildings on Avenue of the States in 2014

Chester County originally stretched from the Delaware River to the Susquehanna River from its founding in 1682 until 1729 when Lancaster County was formed from the western part. Chester served as the county seat for Chester County from 1682 to 1788. In 1724, the Chester Courthouse was built to support the legal needs of the county.

Chester played only a small role in the American Revolutionary War. Throughout 1776 and 1777, there were significant forces stationed in Chester and nearby Marcus Hook. In April 1776, nearly 1,000 men were stationed in Chester under Colonel Samuel Miles in preparation for the defense of Philadelphia. However, Colonel Miles led the troops to New York City in July 1776 when it became clear that the British Fleet was threatening New York rather than Philadelphia. It was from off Chester where HMS Eagle was moored that Vice Admiral Lord Richard Howe wrote 5 December 1777 sending details of the Court Martials onboard HMS Somerset, 26 November into the cause of the loss of HMS Augusta and HMS Merlin.

In 1777, the Continental Army led by George Washington passed through Chester on the way to meet the British Army led by General Howe at the Battle of Brandywine. John Armstrong was ordered to take command of the militia stationed at Chester. The Continental Army fled back to Chester after defeat at the Battle of Brandywine. A portion of the British force occupied Chester as they pursued the Continental Army in its retreat to Philadelphia.

In 1788, the Chester County seat was moved from Chester to West Chester. In 1789, Delaware County was formed from the eastern part of Chester County, and Chester became the new county seat.

The borough of Chester was governed under the charter granted by Penn in 1701 until March 5, 1795, when it was incorporated by the Pennsylvania Assembly.

=== 19th century ===
In the 1700s and 1800s, Chester was a hub for business due to easy access to the Delaware River for the transport of raw materials and finished goods by ship. By the mid-1800s, many textile mills and factories were built along Chester Creek including the Upland Mills by John Price Crozer and the Powhattan Mills by David Reese Esrey and Hugh Shaw.

During the War of 1812, a group of volunteers from Chester called the Mifflin Guards was raised and led by Samuel Anderson. The troops were sent to Fort DuPont to defend the Delaware River from the threatened attack of British Admiral George Cockburn but did not see any action.

In 1851, the Delaware County seat was moved from Chester to the borough of Media. On February 14, 1866, Chester was incorporated as a city and the first mayor elected was John Larkin, Jr.

In 1871, the Delaware River Iron Ship Building and Engine Works was opened by John Roach through the purchase of the Reaney, Son & Archbold shipyard. The first steel ships of the U.S. Navy were built at the Roach shipyard. For the first 15 years of operation, it was the largest and most productive shipyard in the United States. More tonnage of ships were built at the Roach shipyard than its next two competitors combined.

Roach built other businesses to supply materials for his shipbuilding including the Chester Rolling Mill in 1873 to supply metal hull plates and beams, the Chester Pipe and Tube Company in 1877 for the manufacture of iron pipes and boiler tubes, and the Standard Steel Casting Company in 1883 to supply steel ingots.

Roach built the Combination Steel and Iron Company in 1880 to supply steel rails and other products for businesses beyond the Roach shipyard. He lost control of the company after his shipbuilding enterprise entered receivership in 1885.

=== 20th century ===
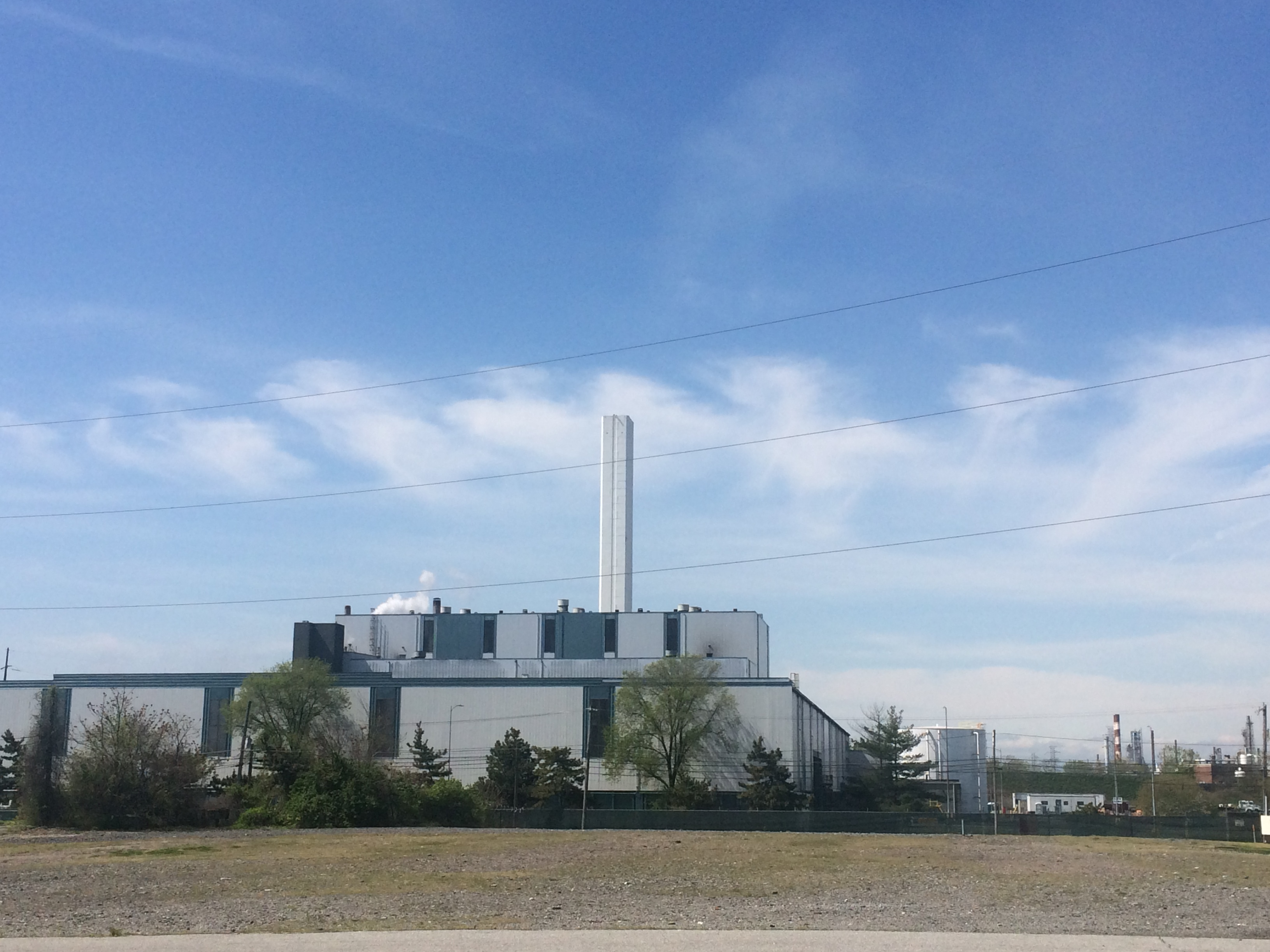
Covanta Delaware Valley Resource Recovery Facility

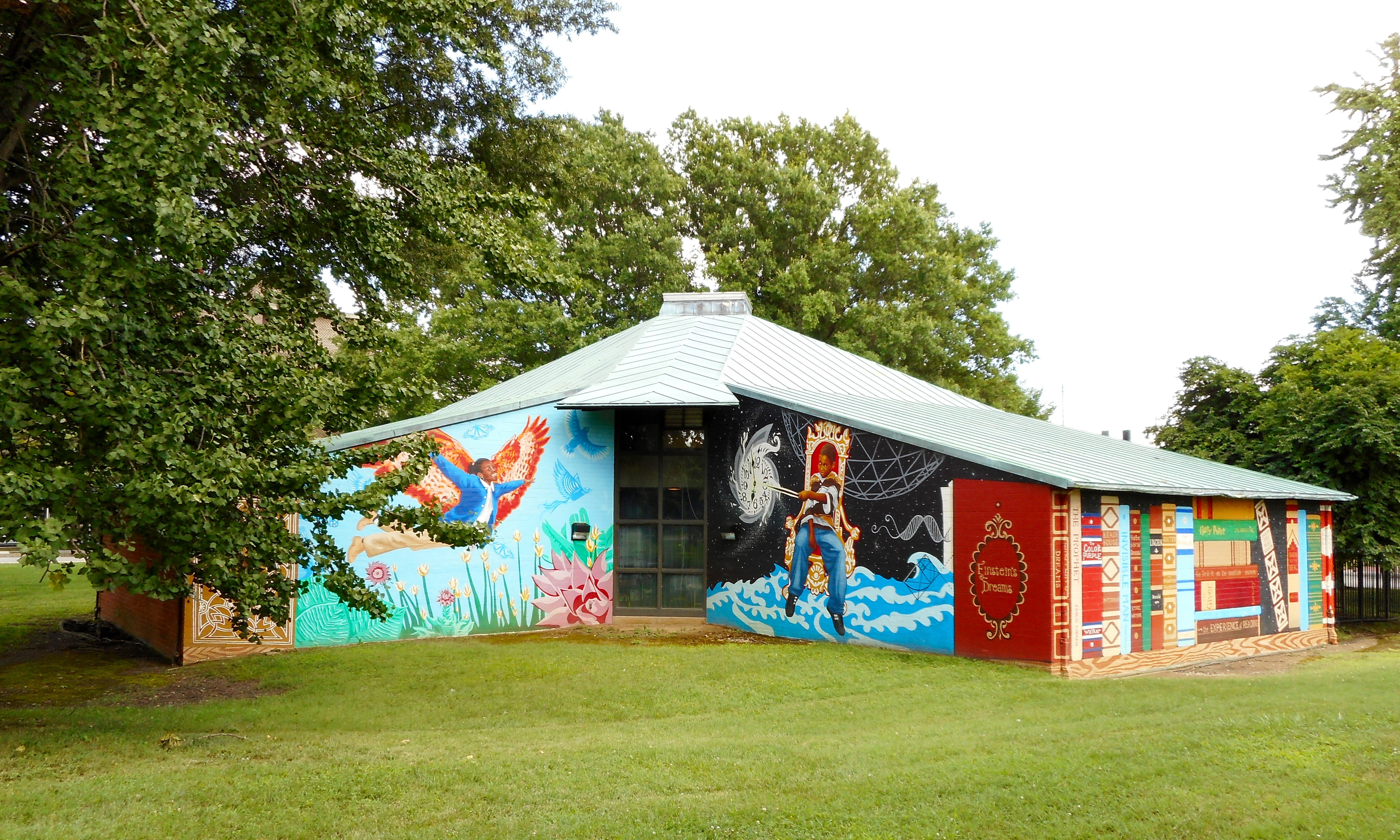
J. Lewis Crozer Library

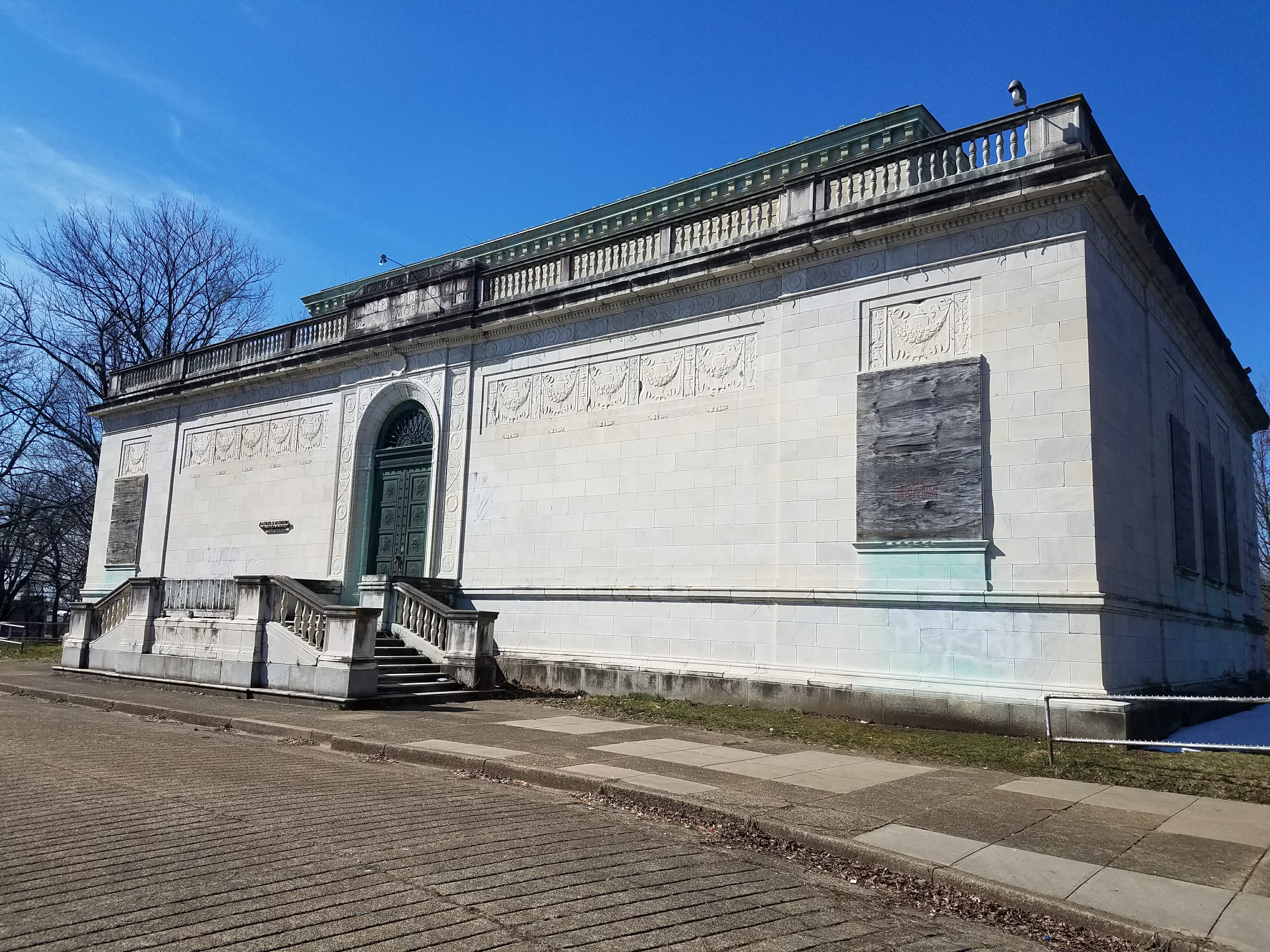
Deshong Art Museum

Chester was known as a freewheeling destination for vices such as drugs, alcohol, numbers rackets, gambling and prostitution. Chester was widely known as Greater Philadelphia's "Saloon Town". By 1914, Chester had more saloons than police officers; approximately 1 saloon per every 987 residents.

During and following World War I, Chester grew significantly as people migrated to the city for jobs, 63% of which were in manufacturing. Between 1910 and 1920, Chester's population increased from 38,000 to 58,000 due to the influx of poor Southern European and Eastern European immigrants and African-American migrants from the South, searching for employment in the city's expanding shipbuilding and manufacturing industries. The Sun Shipbuilding & Drydock Co. was opened in 1917 to build ships for the United States until its closure in 1990. The idled Roach shipyard was purchased in 1917 by W. Averell Harriman to build merchant ships during World War I, and renamed the Merchant Shipbuilding Corporation. The shipyard closed permanently in 1923.

Like many boomtowns, Chester was unprepared for the social changes that came along with rapid growth. As southern blacks migrated to Pennsylvania as part of the Great Migration, racial violence broke out, racially segregated neighborhoods expanded and economic discrimination emerged. A four-day race riot that resulted in seven deaths broke out in the city in July 1917, and the separation of blacks and whites in Chester's neighborhoods and workplaces became more defined.

In 1927, the Ford Motor Company opened the Chester Assembly factory on the site of the previous Roach and Merchant shipyard and built cars there until its closure in 1961.

Chester experienced its second growth period during World War II. Manufacturing increased exponentially including companies such as Wetherill Steel and Boilermakers, Congoleum-Nairn, Aberfoyles Textiles, Scott Paper Company, Belmont Iron Works, American Steel Foundries, Crew Levick Oil, Crown Smelting, Fields Brick Company, Hetzel and Ford Motor Company. During World War II, the Sun Shipyard became the largest single shipyard in the world.

External audio
- Chester, A City Working on a New Narrative, 43:46, Grapple, Keystone Crossroads

The increased labor needs brought a flood of new workers to the city. The wartime labor force for industries along the waterfront soared to 100,000.

Chester began losing its mainstay manufacturing jobs by the early 1960s. Ford Motor Company shuttered its Chester plant, American Viscose Corporation in nearby Marcus Hook closed, Baldwin Locomotive Works in nearby Eddystone was close to bankruptcy and Sun Shipyard employment had fallen from a high of 35,000 in 1945 to 4,000 in 1962. Chester's precipitous drop in jobs in the late 20th and early 21st centuries caused the city's population to diminish from over 66,000 in 1950 to under 34,000 in 2010.

In 1963 and 1964, the Chester school protests fought to end the de facto segregation that resulted in the racial categorization of Chester public schools, even after the landmark 1954 U.S. Supreme Court case Brown v. Board of Education. The racial unrest and civil rights protests were led by George Raymond of the NAACP and Stanley Branche of CFFN and made Chester one of the key battlegrounds of the civil rights movement.

In April 1964, a series of almost nightly protests brought chaos to Chester. Mayor James Gorbey issued "The Police Position to Preserve the Public Peace", a 10-point statement promising an immediate return to law and order. The city deputized firemen and trash collectors to help handle demonstrators. The State of Pennsylvania deployed 50 state troopers to assist the 77-member Chester police force. The demonstrations were marked by violence and police brutality with Chester being dubbed the "Birmingham of the North" by civil rights activist James Farmer. Over 600 people were arrested over a two-month period of civil rights rallies, marches, pickets, boycotts, and sit-ins. National civil rights leaders such as Gloria Richardson, Malcolm X and Dick Gregory came to Chester in support of the demonstrations. Pennsylvania Governor William Scranton became involved in the negotiations and convinced the protestors to obey a court-ordered moratorium on demonstrations by agreeing to hold hearings on the de facto segregation of public schools in Chester.

The Pennsylvania Human Relations Committee determined that the Chester School Board had violated the law and the Chester School District was ordered to desegregate the city's six predominantly African-American schools. The city appealed the ruling, which delayed implementation, but the schools were eventually desegregated.

In 1978, an intense fire broke out at Wade Dump, a rubber recycling facility and illegal industrial chemical dumping site. It burned out of control for several days. The burning chemicals caused multi-colored smoke and noxious fumes which injured 43 firemen and caused long-term health problems for the first responders to the fire. In 1981, the location was declared a Superfund cleanup site and remediation occurred throughout the 1980s. In 1989, the site was deemed safe and removed from the Superfund national priorities list. In 2004, the site was converted to a parking lot for Commodore Barry Bridge Park.

By the 1980s, Chester was a city bereft of industry. Many bottom-rung projects were initiated in Chester, including the Westinghouse trash incinerator, a sewage treatment plant, and a prison. Chester residents and politicians began pushing back against the placement of projects that increased concerns about pollution, noise, and trucks, such as a contaminated soil remediation facility, the trash incinerator, the DELCORA sewage waste treatment center and the Abbonizio recycling center.

In 1995, the state designated Chester as a financially distressed municipality.

=== 21st century ===
Recent programs to foster investment into Chester include the Pennsylvania Keystone Opportunity Zone (KOZ) program, which incentivizes companies with state and local tax breaks to invest in KOZ-designated areas. The Wharf at Rivertown, a $60 million renovation of the Chester Waterside Station of the Philadelphia Electric Company, originally built in 1918, provides recreational and office space for businesses.

Harrah's Casino and Racetrack began harness racing in September 2006 and opened its racino in January 2007. Subaru Park, home of the Major League Soccer Philadelphia Union franchise, opened in 2010.

Despite the recent investments into the community, Governor Tom Wolf declared a fiscal emergency for Chester in 2020 and the city declared bankruptcy in 2022. It was the 31st municipality to declare bankruptcy since the U.S. Congress offered the program in the 1930s.

National Register of Historic Places in Chester are: Delaware County National Bank, 1724 Chester Courthouse, Chester Waterside Station of the Philadelphia Electric Company, Old Main and Chemistry Building, Third Presbyterian Church, William Penn Landing Site, and the former Second Street Bridge.

== Geography ==
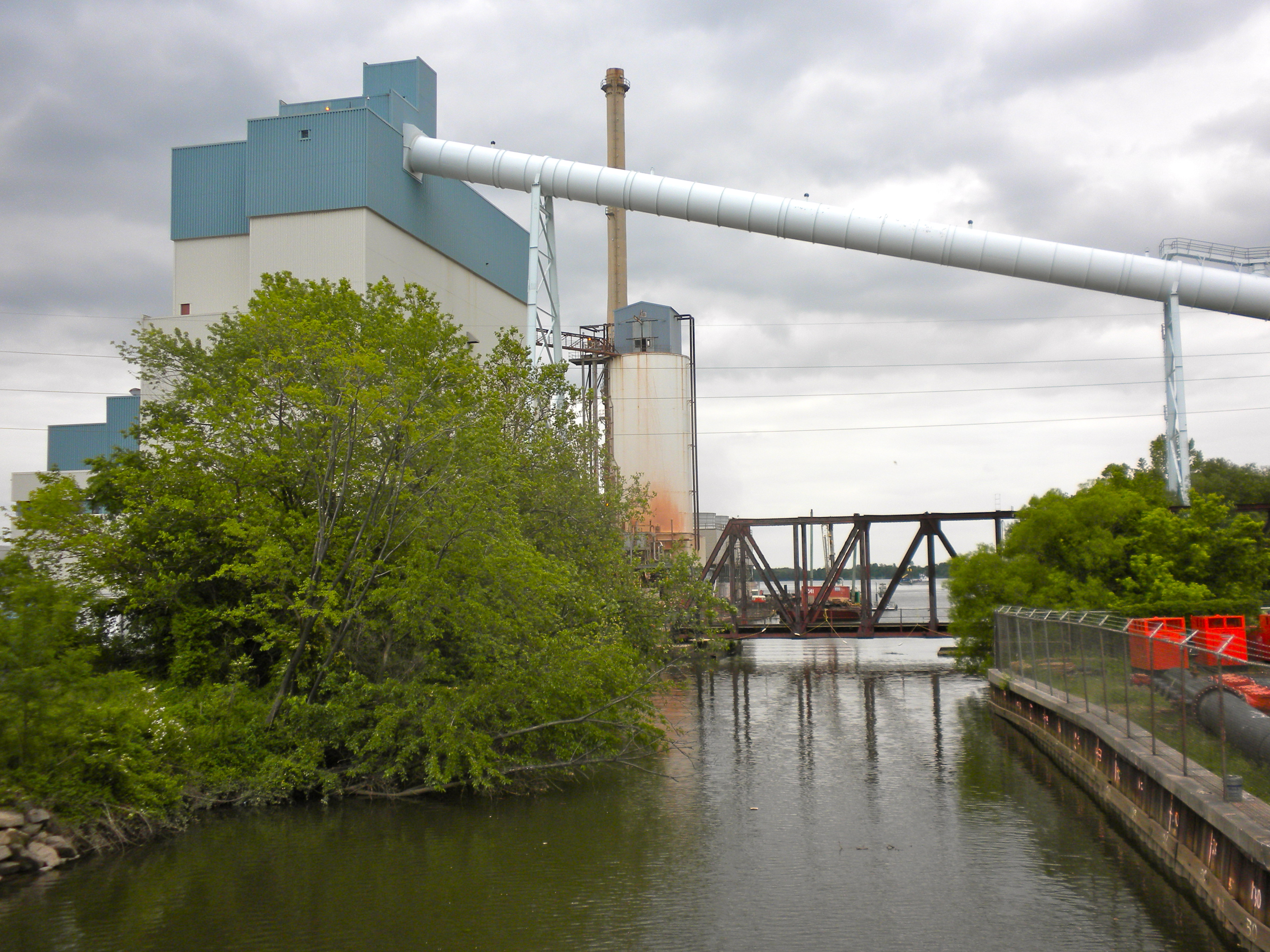
Confluence of Chester Creek and the Delaware River

Chester borders on (clockwise from southwest to northeast) Trainer Borough, Upper Chichester Township, Chester Township, Upland Borough, Parkside Borough, Brookhaven Borough, Nether Providence Township, Ridley Township, and Eddystone Borough in Pennsylvania. Chester is bordered to the south by the Delaware River. The city has a total area of 6.0 square miles (15.6 km^{2}), 4.8 square miles (12.5 km^{2}) of which is land and 1.2 square miles (3.0 km^{2}) of which (19.42%) is water, according to the U.S. Census Bureau.

Chester Creek meets the Delaware River in Chester. Chester's northeastern border is at Ridley Creek. The Port of Chester is located in Chester along the Delaware River.

=== Climate ===
Located at a low elevation between Philadelphia and Wilmington, Delaware, Chester experiences a humid subtropical climate (Cfa.) The hardiness zone is 7b.

Climate data for Chester (Elevation: 10 ft (3 m)) 1981-2010 Averages
Month	Jan	Feb	Mar	Apr	May	Jun	Jul	Aug	Sep	Oct	Nov	Dec	Year
Mean daily maximum °F (°C)	40.5 (4.7)	44.2 (6.8)	52.0 (11.1)	63.4 (17.4)	73.4 (23.0)	82.7 (28.2)	87.0 (30.6)	85.2 (29.6)	78.3 (25.7)	66.7 (19.3)	56.1 (13.4)	45.0 (7.2)	64.6 (18.1)
Daily mean °F (°C)	33.7 (0.9)	36.5 (2.5)	43.7 (6.5)	54.3 (12.4)	64.1 (17.8)	73.7 (23.2)	78.3 (25.7)	76.8 (24.9)	69.5 (20.8)	58.1 (14.5)	48.3 (9.1)	38.2 (3.4)	56.4 (13.6)
Mean daily minimum °F (°C)	26.8 (−2.9)	28.9 (−1.7)	35.3 (1.8)	45.2 (7.3)	54.8 (12.7)	64.6 (18.1)	69.7 (20.9)	68.4 (20.2)	60.7 (15.9)	49.4 (9.7)	40.5 (4.7)	31.4 (−0.3)	48.1 (8.9)
Average precipitation inches (mm)	3.15 (80)	2.70 (69)	3.87 (98)	3.62 (92)	3.81 (97)	3.80 (97)	4.65 (118)	3.56 (90)	4.21 (107)	3.44 (87)	3.27 (83)	3.62 (92)	43.70 (1,110)
Average relative humidity (%)	65.3	60.7	57.6	57.2	60.8	62.7	64.4	65.8	67.8	67.3	65.3	65.1	63.4
Average dew point °F (°C)	23.3 (−4.8)	24.2 (−4.3)	29.7 (−1.3)	39.5 (4.2)	50.3 (10.2)	60.2 (15.7)	65.3 (18.5)	64.5 (18.1)	58.4 (14.7)	47.3 (8.5)	37.2 (2.9)	27.5 (−2.5)	44.0 (6.7)
Source: PRISM

== Demographics ==
Historical population
Census	Pop.	Note	%±
1820	657		—
1830	847		28.9%
1850	1,667		—
1860	4,631		177.8%
1870	9,485		104.8%
1880	14,997		58.1%
1890	20,226		34.9%
1900	33,988		68.0%
1910	38,537		13.4%
1920	58,030		50.6%
1930	59,164		2.0%
1940	59,285		0.2%
1950	66,039		11.4%
1960	63,658		−3.6%
1970	56,331		−11.5%
1980	45,794		−18.7%
1990	41,856		−8.6%
2000	36,854		−12.0%
2010	33,972		−7.8%
2020	32,605		−4.0%
U.S. Decennial Census; 2010 2020

=== Racial and ethnic composition ===
Chester city, Pennsylvania – Racial and ethnic composition Note: the US Census treats Hispanic/Latino as an ethnic category. This table excludes Latinos from the racial categories and assigns them to a separate category. Hispanics/Latinos may be of any race.
Race / Ethnicity (NH = Non-Hispanic)	Pop 1980	Pop 1990	Pop 2000	Pop 2010	Pop 2020	% 1980	% 1990	% 2000	% 2010	% 2020
White alone (NH)	18,894	13,045	6,582	5,117	4,527	41.26%	31.17%	17.86%	15.06%	13.88%
Black or African American alone (NH)	25,850	26,924	27,500	24,803	22,560	56.45%	64.33%	74.62%	73.01%	69.19%
Native American or Alaska Native alone (NH)	38	83	65	69	54	0.08%	0.20%	0.18%	0.20%	0.17%
Asian alone (NH)	73	165	217	213	227	0.16%	0.39%	0.59%	0.63%	0.70%
Native Hawaiian or Pacific Islander alone (NH)	N/A	N/A	4	9	7	N/A	N/A	0.01%	0.03%	0.02%
Other race alone (NH)	15	60	60	30	140	0.03%	0.14%	0.16%	0.09%	0.43%
Mixed race or Multiracial (NH)	N/A	N/A	440	677	1,038	N/A	N/A	1.19%	1.99%	3.18%
Hispanic or Latino (any race)	924	1,579	1,986	3,054	4,052	2.02%	3.77%	5.39%	8.99%	12.43%
Total	45,794	41,856	36,854	33,972	32,605	100.00%	100.00%	100.00%	100.00%	100.00%

=== 2020 census ===
As of the 2020 census, Chester had a population of 32,605. The median age was 33.2 years. 24.5% of residents were under the age of 18 and 13.5% of residents were 65 years of age or older. For every 100 females there were 93.0 males, and for every 100 females age 18 and over there were 90.1 males age 18 and over.

100.0% of residents lived in urban areas, while 0.0% lived in rural areas.

There were 11,805 households in Chester, of which 32.4% had children under the age of 18 living in them. Of all households, 18.0% were married-couple households, 25.0% were households with a male householder and no spouse or partner present, and 49.5% were households with a female householder and no spouse or partner present. About 34.0% of all households were made up of individuals and 13.5% had someone living alone who was 65 years of age or older.

There were 14,023 housing units, of which 15.8% were vacant. The homeowner vacancy rate was 2.5% and the rental vacancy rate was 8.4%.

Racial composition as of the 2020 census
Race	Number	Percent
White	4,952	15.2%
Black or African American	23,013	70.6%
American Indian and Alaska Native	162	0.5%
Asian	234	0.7%
Native Hawaiian and Other Pacific Islander	7	0.0%
Some other race	2,262	6.9%
Two or more races	1,975	6.1%
Hispanic or Latino (of any race)	4,052	12.4%

=== 2010 census ===
As of Census 2010, the racial makeup of the city was 74.7% African American, 17.2% White, 9.0% Hispanic or Latino of any race, 0.6% Asian, 0.4% Native American, 0.1% Native Hawaiian and other Pacific Islander, 3.9% from other races, and 3.0% from two or more races.

There were 11,662 households, out of which 37.3% had children under the age of 18, 19.5% were headed by married couples living together, 35.6% had a female householder with no husband present, and 38.1% were non-families. 31.2% of all households were made up of individuals, and 11.1% were someone living alone who was 65 years of age or older. The average household size was 2.64, and the average family size was 3.34.

== Government ==
Chester has a mayor-council government system, consisting of a popularly elected city mayor and city council. The terms of the mayor and members are four years.

The current mayor of the City of Chester is Stefan Roots, who won the Democratic nomination in May 2021, over incumbent Mayor Thaddeus Kirkland. In May 2023, Roots defeated Kirkland in the Chester Democratic mayoral primary election. Roots defeated independent candidate Anita J. Littleton in the November 2023 general election and was sworn into office on January 3, 2024.

The Chester City Council consists of the mayor and four council members. Council members are elected at-large to serve the entire city. Council meetings are generally held the second and fourth Wednesday of each month. The five help administer the five municipal departments:

- The Department of Public Affairs
- The Department of Public Safety
- The Department of Public Works
- The Parks and Recreation Department
- The Finance and Tax Office

The city government has been in financial distress for many years and has operated under the state's Act 47 provisions for twenty-one years. The act provides for municipalities that are near bankruptcy.

=== Political corruption ===
Chester has been hurt for decades by corrupt politicians and organized crime. Chester's Republican Party political machine was one of the nation's oldest and most corrupt. John J. McClure took over from his father, William McClure, in 1907 and was the political boss for the machine until his death in 1965. In 1933, McClure was found guilty in federal court and sentenced to 18 months in prison for vice and rum-running, but his conviction was overturned on appeal.

In 1941, McClure was indicted for conspiracy to gain a $250,000 profit from the sale of the Chester Water Works to a private buyer. McClure and four Chester City Council members were acquitted but also ordered by the court to return the money to the city of Chester.

With the exception of 1904–1905, the Republican political machine controlled Chester politics for over a century. The first non-machine mayor was elected in 1992: Barbara Bohannan-Sheppard; however, in 1995, she lost her re-election bid and was replaced by Republican Aaron Wilson, Jr.

In the 1990s, the Pennsylvania Crime Commission reported that Chester's government had been dominated by "a triad of criminals, corrupt politicians and rogue law-enforcement officers" since the 1960s. John H. Nacrelli, the mayor of Chester from 1968 to 1979, was convicted of racketeering and income tax evasion for accepting $22,000 in bribes from an illegal gambling operation with ties to organized crime and served two years in prison.

== Economy ==
For the period 2010–2014, the estimated median annual income for a household in the city was $28,607, and the median income for a family was $34,840. Male full-time workers had a median income of $34,354 versus $30,634 for females. The per capita income for the city was $15,516. About 27.3% of families and 33.1% of the total population were below the poverty line, including 47.7% of those under age 18 and 18.4% of those age 65 or over.

== Sports ==
=== Horse racing ===
Harrah's Philadelphia

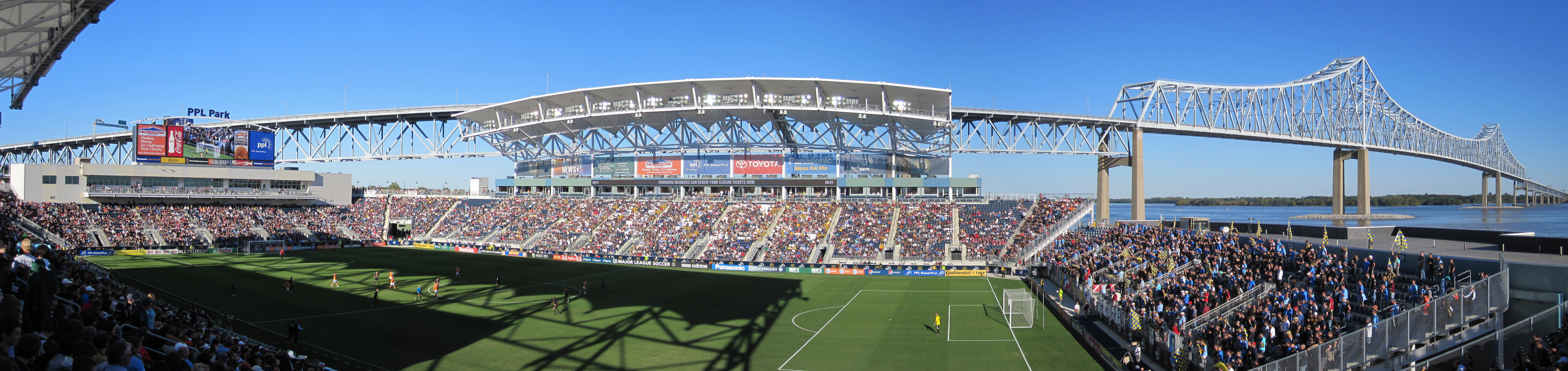
Interior of Subaru Park and the Commodore Barry Bridge in 2010

With the construction of Harrah's Philadelphia, the city received a series of horse races that were once held at the Brandywine Raceway and the now-defunct Liberty Bell Park Racetrack. The racino opened on January 22, 2008, and features a specially constructed bridge that enables the midpoint of races, contested at one mile, to take place over the Delaware River.

=== Soccer ===
Club	Sport	League	Venue	Established	Championships
Philadelphia Union	Soccer	MLS	Subaru Park	2010	

Chester is the home of the Major League Soccer Philadelphia Union franchise, which plays its home games at Subaru Park, a soccer-specific stadium at the base of the Commodore Barry Bridge. Located on the Delaware River, the stadium is part of a larger development called Rivertown. Financing for the Rivertown development was announced in early 2008 by Governor Ed Rendell and Pennsylvania Senate Majority Leader Dominic Pileggi, with $25 million going to the construction of Subaru Park, and an additional $7 million towards a two-phase project composing of 186 townhouses, 25 apartments, 335,000 square feet (31,100 m^{2}) of office space, a 200,000-square-foot (19,000 m^{2}) convention center, more than 20,000 square feet (1,900 m^{2}) of retail space, and a parking structure to house 1,350 cars. In phase two, another 200 apartments will be built, along with 100,000 square feet (9,300 m^{2}) of office space and 22,000 square feet (2,000 m^{2}) of retail space.

== Education ==
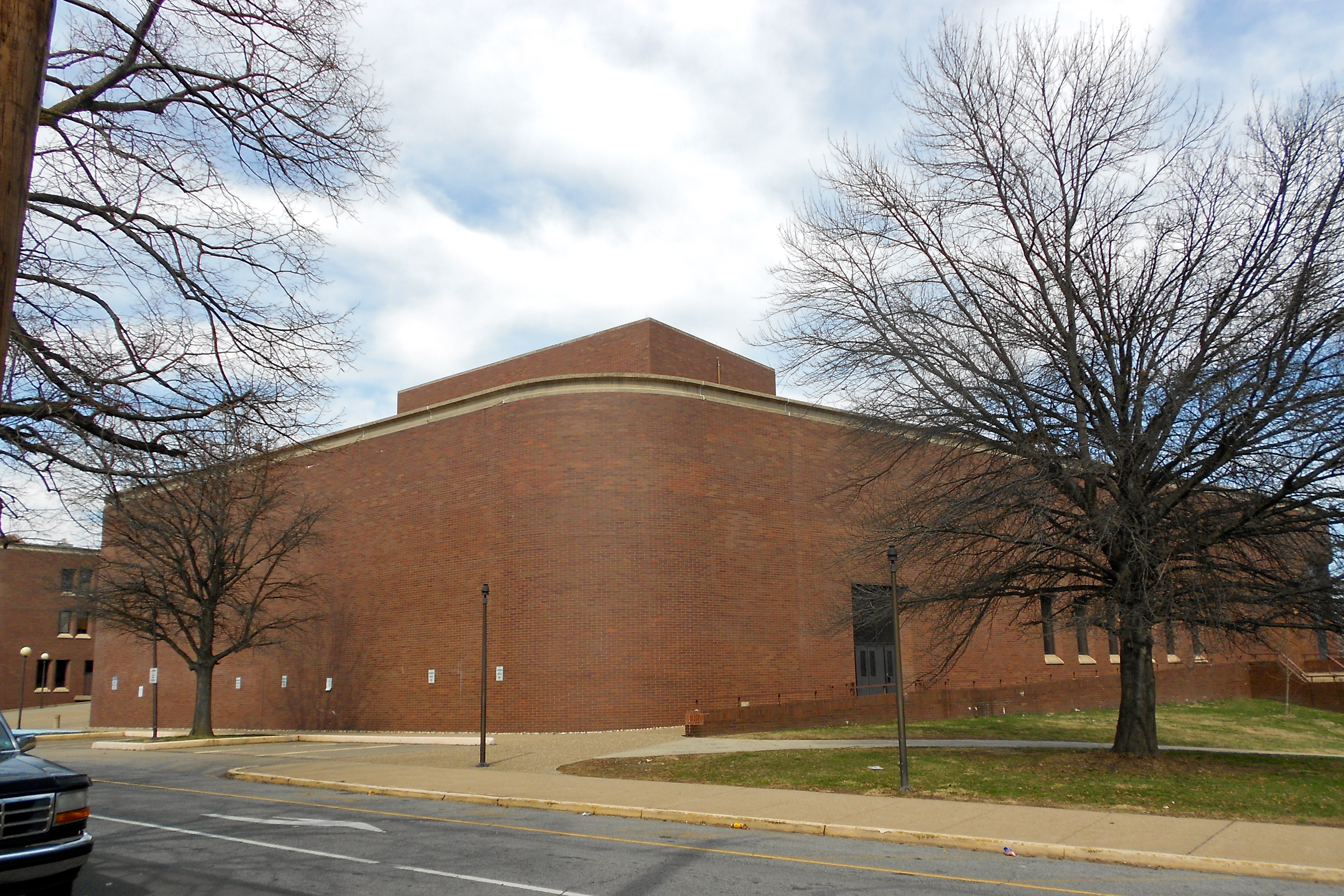
Chester High School

In 1995, the city's schools ranked last among the state's 501 districts, leading Pennsylvania education officials in 2001 to hire the for-profit Edison Schools to run the local school district for three years.

=== Primary and secondary schools ===
==== Public schools ====
The Chester Upland School District serves the city, along with nearby Chester Township and the borough of Upland.

==== Parochial schools ====
Drexel Neumann Academy, of the Roman Catholic Archdiocese of Philadelphia, is Chester's only parochial school. It is run by the Saint Katharine Drexel Roman Catholic Church which was established in 1993 by the Archdiocese of Philadelphia with the consolidation of all Roman Catholic parishes in the city.

Resurrection of Our Lord School in Chester closed in 1993. St. James High School for Boys closed its doors in 1993 due to low enrollment.

==== Charter schools ====
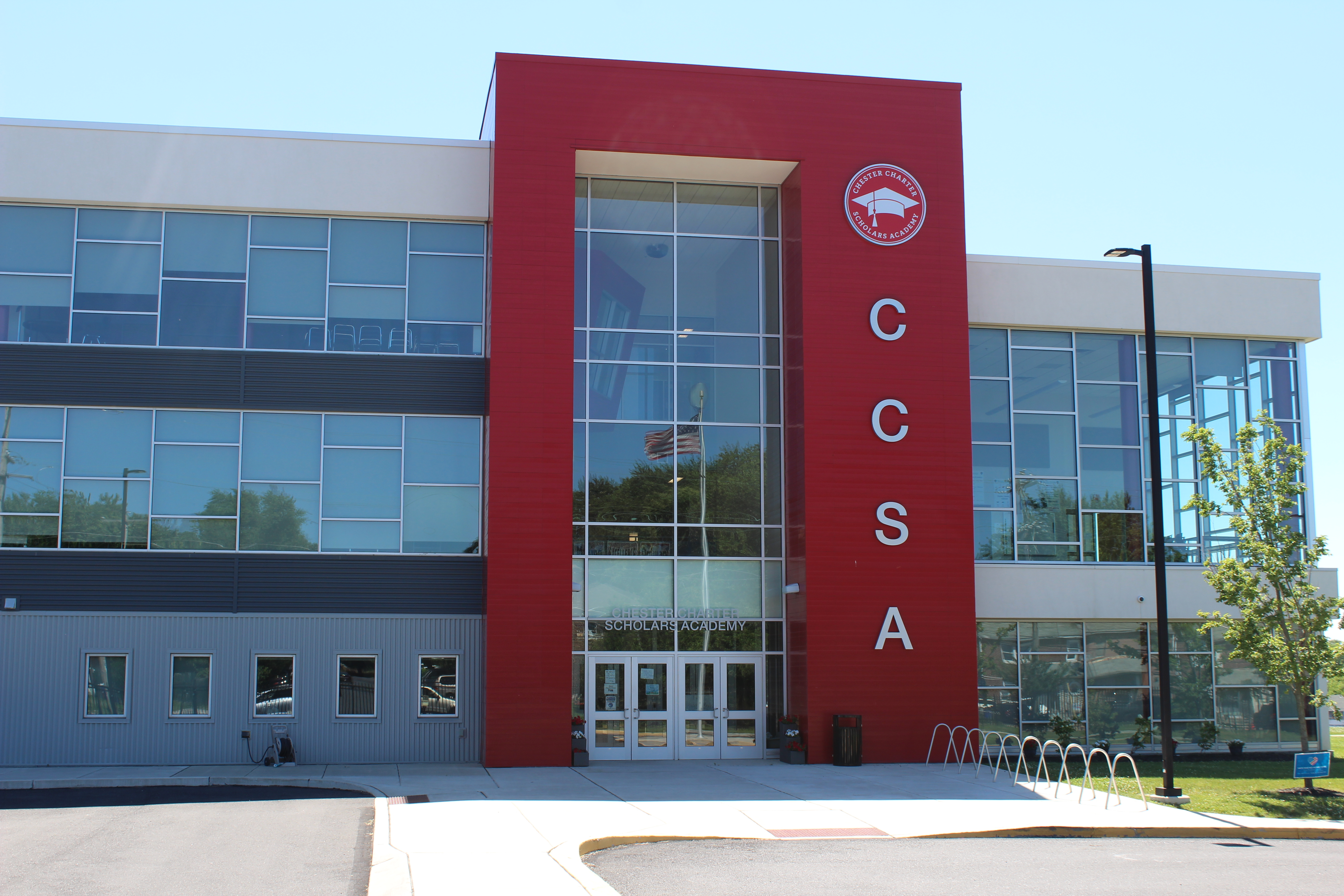
Chester Charter Scholars Academy

Chester Charter Scholars Academy began in 2008 as a small public-private partnership between The Chester Fund for Education and the Arts and the Chester-Upland school district. The school was originally called the Chester Upland School for the Arts (CUSA) and operated until 2011 when significant staff reduction occurred due to state funding cuts. In 2012, a charter school application was accepted and the school operated in Aston until September 2017 when a $30 million campus was built on Highland Ave.

Chester Community Charter School is a charter school established in 1998 that serves over 4,000 students in grades K-8. The school operates four campuses, the Upland campus at 1100 Main Street in Upland, the Aston campus at 200 Commerce Drive in Aston, the East Campus at 302 East 5th Street and the West Campus at 2730 Bethel Road in Chester Township.

Widener Partnership Charter School was first launched in 2006, and is located across from the main campus of Widener University. It enrolls students from kindergarten to eighth grade. Widener University provides support to the charter school including educating staff, providing work to graduate students, and use of the university facilities. The school also has a number of outside partners that include 21st Century Learning Communities, Andrew Hicks Foundation, Big Brothers Big Sisters, Big Friends, Chester Education Foundation, Earth Force, Exelon Foundation, Incredible Years, PECO, and Soccer for Success. The Widener Partnership Charter School also has recently added a new $4.6 million wing of the school at 1450 Edgmont Ave. This new edition includes a science learning center, an extension of the library, a gymnasium, eight classrooms and eight offices.

=== Colleges and universities ===
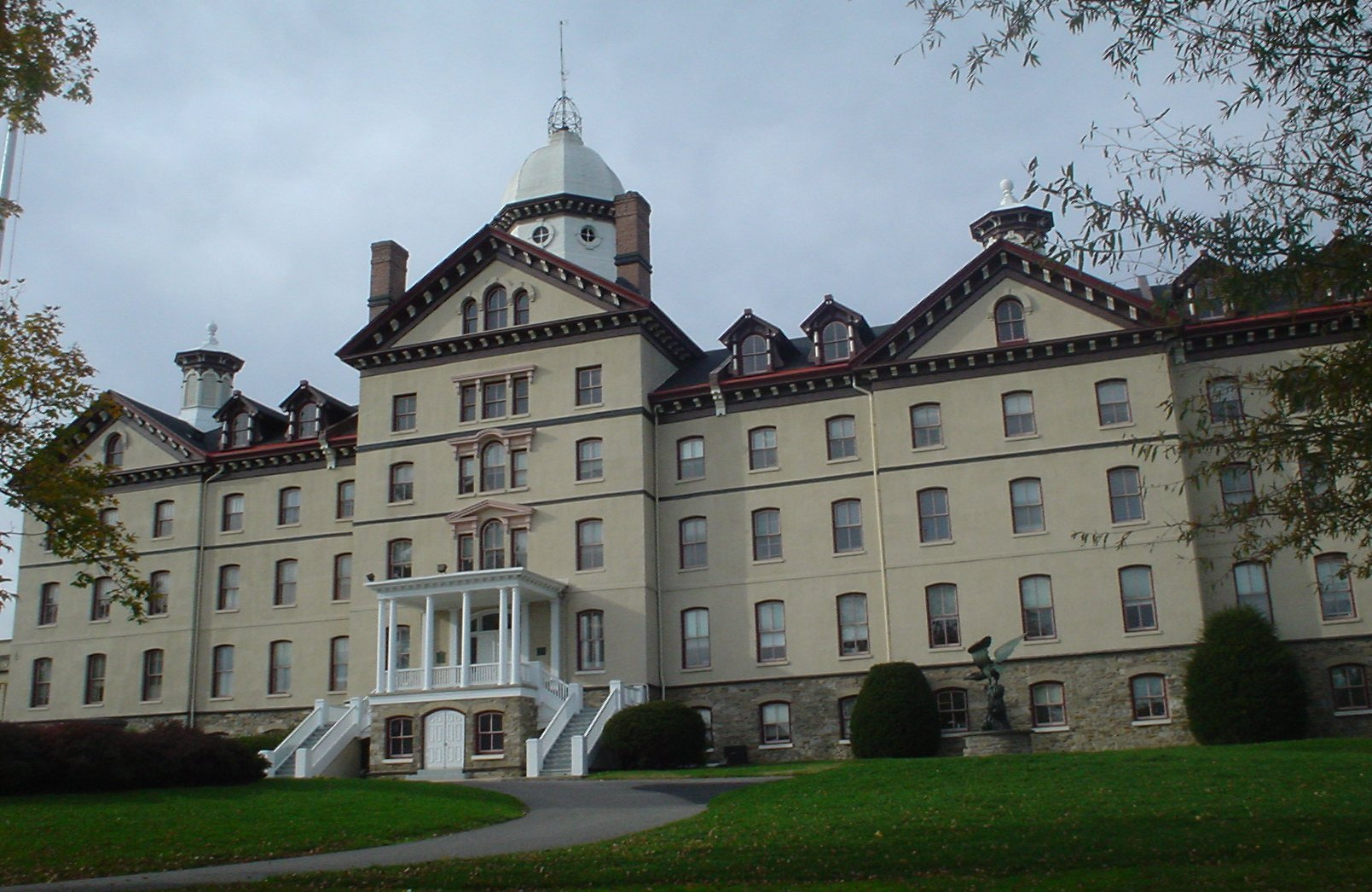
Old Main and Chemistry Building on Widener University's campus

Widener University is a private university in Chester. Its main campus sits on 108 acres (0.44 km^{2}). The university has three other campuses: two in Pennsylvania (Harrisburg and Exton) and one in Wilmington, Delaware.

Founded as The Bullock School for Boys in 1821, the school was established in Wilmington, Delaware. It became The Alsop School for Boys from 1846 to 1853, and then Hyatt's Select School for Boys from 1853 to 1859. Military instruction was introduced in 1858, and in 1859, the school changed its name to Delaware Military Academy. It moved to Chester in 1862 and became Pennsylvania Military Academy. It was known as Pennsylvania Military College after 1892 and adopted the Widener name in 1972.

About 3,300 undergraduates and 3,300 graduate students attend Widener in eight degree-granting schools. The university offers associates, bachelors, masters, and doctoral degrees in areas ranging from traditional liberal arts to professional programs. The Carnegie Foundation classifies Widener as a Doctoral/Research University and a Community Engagement Institution.

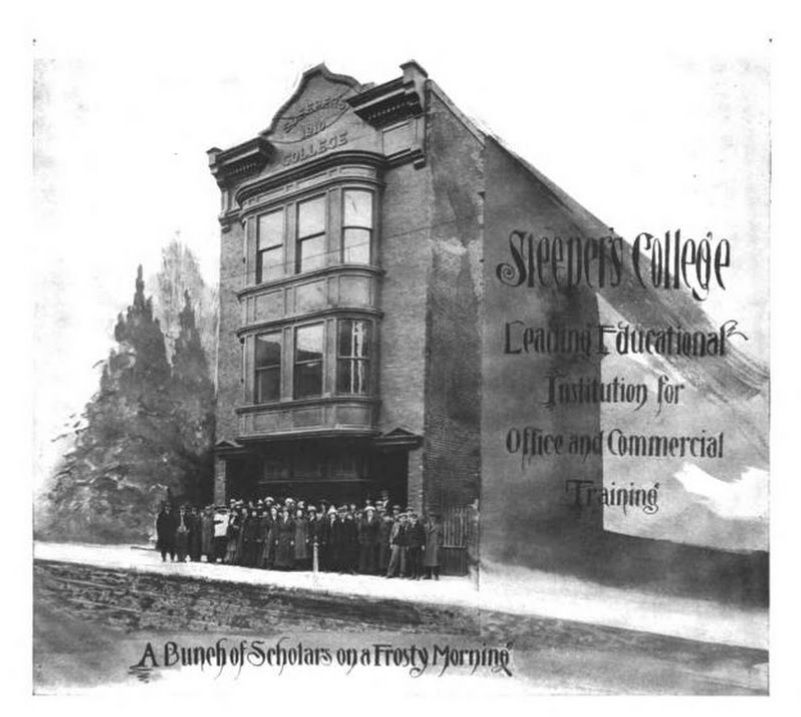
Sleeper's College provided office and commercial training

Sleeper's College was a vocational school founded in 1910 for "office and commercial training".

== Transportation ==
As of 2015, there were 97.93 miles (157.60 km) of public roads in Chester, of which 18.33 miles (29.50 km) were maintained by the Pennsylvania Department of Transportation (PennDOT) and 79.60 miles (128.10 km) were maintained by the city.

In Chester, east–west streets are numbered, while north–south streets carry names. The main bisecting street, known as The Avenue of the States south of 9th Street and Edgmont Avenue north of it, is signed as both Pennsylvania Route 320 (southbound only; northbound PA Rt. 320 uses adjacent Madison Street to Interstate 95) and Pennsylvania Route 352. North of I-95, State Route 320 follows Providence Avenue. Between 1993 and 2006, the Pennsylvania Department of Transportation (PennDOT) widened and realigned Pennsylvania Route 291 from Trainer to Eddystone from a two-lane roadway to a five-lane roadway. This widening and realignment project, spearheaded by the late State Senator Clarence D. Bell, allowed PA Route 291 to maintain at least two travel lanes in each direction.

=== Highways and bridges ===
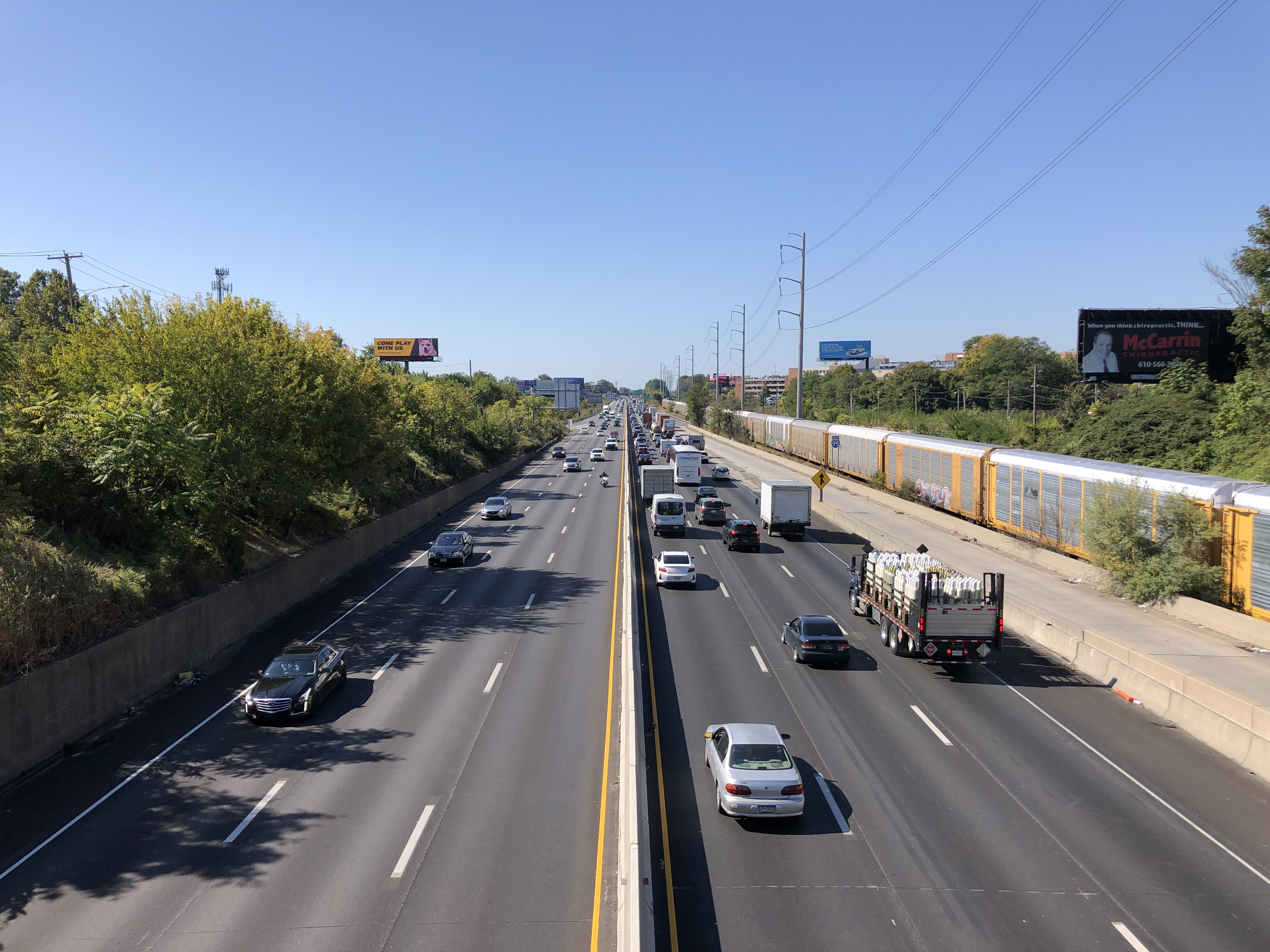
I-95 southbound in Chester

Chester is served by Interstate 95, with Interstate 476 terminating outside the city limits in Crum Lynne. I-95 was built in the 1960s and originally terminated just north of the Chester/Eddystone line at the present-day I-95/I-476 junction. It was extended north in the 1970s, with the section around Philadelphia International Airport being completed in 1985. Three exits on I-95 allow access to Highland Avenue, Kerlin Street, and Edgmont Avenue/Avenue of the States (Rts. 320 & 352).

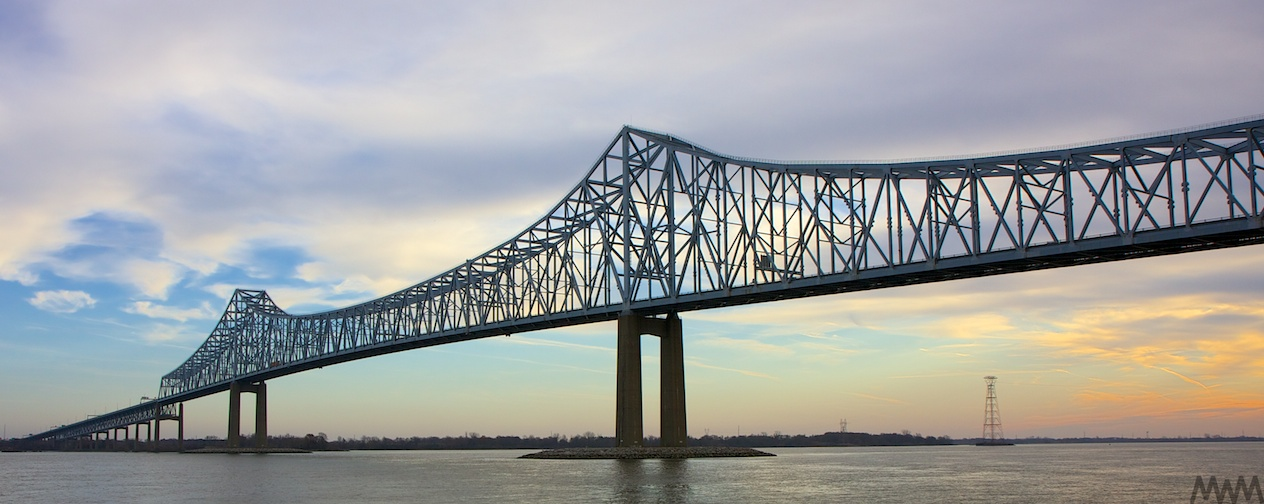
Commodore Barry Bridge, crossing the Delaware River, at Chester

Two federal highway routes, U.S. Route 13 and U.S. Route 322, also run through Chester. US 13 enters Chester from Trainer on W. 4th Street, becomes part of Highland Avenue between W. 4th Street and W. 9th Street, and then continues on 9th Street to Morton Avenue. US 13 follows Morton Avenue in the city's Sun Village section until it crosses Ridley Creek and becomes Chester Pike in Eddystone.

US 322 enters Chester from the northeast, merges with I-95 briefly and crosses the Delaware River over the Commodore Barry Bridge. Prior to the bridge's opening in 1974, US 322 would cross the Delaware River on the Chester-Bridgeport Ferry, via Flower Street, causing major backups because of limited space on the ferries. With the expansion of State Rt. 291 and the redevelopment of the Chester Waterfront, both the Delaware River Port Authority and PennDOT built a pair of entrance (westbound) and exit (eastbound) ramps to PA Rt. 291, providing direct access to the waterfront without using local streets. The ramps were built between 2007 and 2010 and were opened in 2011.

Plans for reconstruction of US 322 and the merge with I-95 are underway. The road currently requires traffic to merge onto I-95 in the left lane and requires changing lanes three times to the Commodore Barry Bridge exit ramp in less than a mile.

A $16.6 million project to repair eight I-95 bridges will begin March 2017 and is expected to be finished in November 2018. Improvements to Chestnut Street and Morton Avenue are also included in the project.

=== Public transportation ===
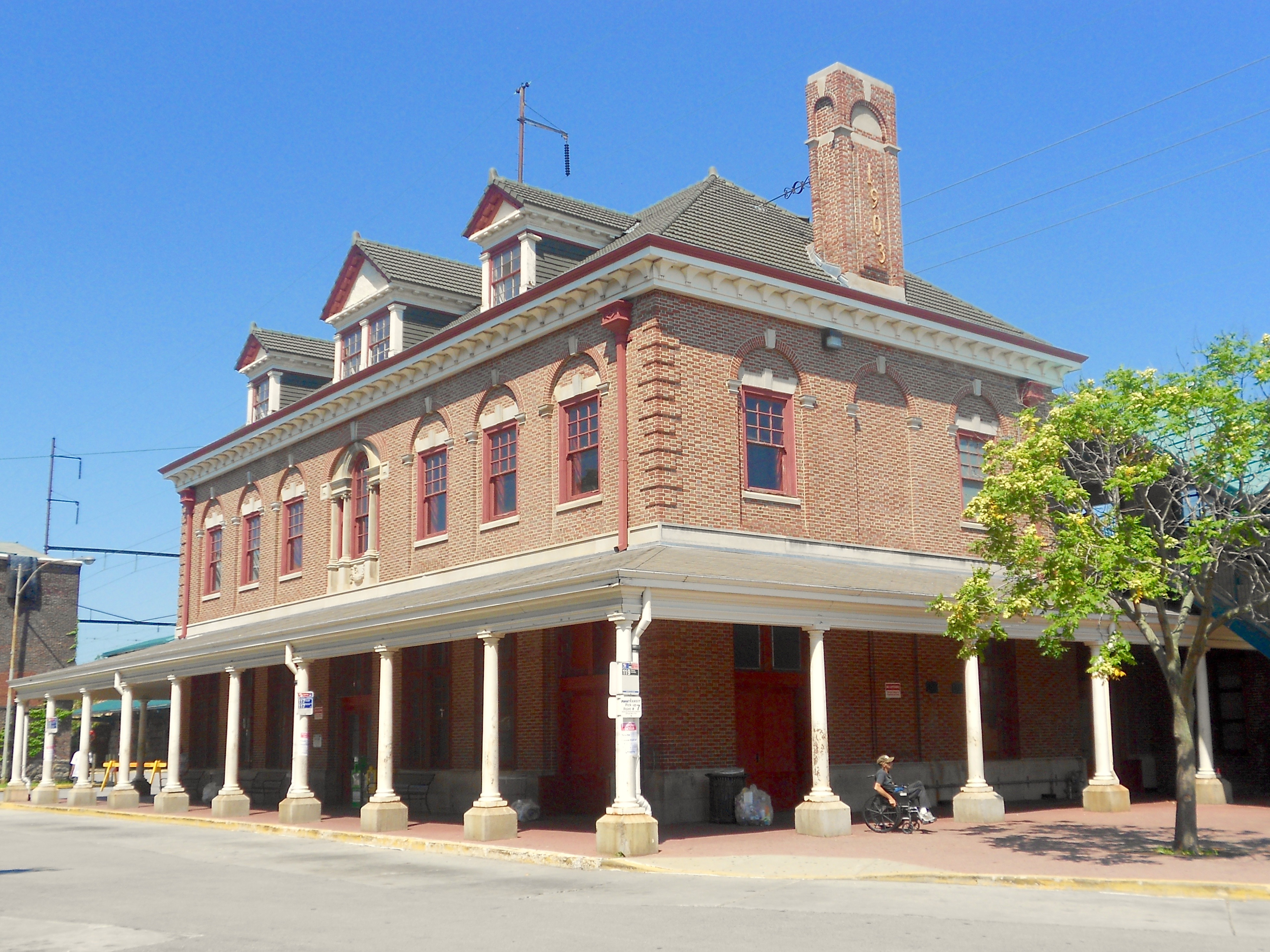
Chester Transit Center

Public bus transportation in Chester is provided by the Southeastern Pennsylvania Transportation Authority (SEPTA), which acquired the former Suburban Philadelphia Transit Authority (aka "Red Arrow" Lines) in 1968. Seven bus routes (Routes 37, 109, 113, 114, 117, 118, and 119) serve the city, with the Chester Transit Center as the hub.

The city is also served by the SEPTA Wilmington/Newark Line commuter rail service. The Chester Transit Center and Highland Avenue stations are the two SEPTA train stations in Chester. The Lamokin Street station was run as a flagstop station until it was closed and demolished in 2003 due to low usage.

The Chester Transit Center was both a commuter and intercity stop on the former Pennsylvania Railroad's New York City–Washington, D.C. route. The Chester Transit Center was bypassed when Amtrak took over intercity rail passenger services in 1971, with the exception from April 30, 1978, to October 29, 1983, when the Chesapeake stopped once daily in each direction between Philadelphia and Washington, D.C.

== Public safety ==
=== Law enforcement ===
City of Chester Police Department is the primary agency for the city of Chester. Chester Housing Authority Police Department, Delaware River and Port Authority Police Department, and Pennsylvania State Police also support Chester Police Department in their daily functions acting both in coordination and on their own within the scope of their jurisdiction throughout the city of Chester. Chester Police Department regularly requests support from neighboring municipalities for incidents occurring in the city.

Chester is the only municipality in Delaware County with its own sector: Delaware County Sector 3.

=== Crime ===
According to a report in 2020 by NeighborhoodScout, Chester ranked 20th on a list of the "Top 100 Most Dangerous Cities in the U.S.". NeighborhoodScout says one's chance of becoming a victim of either violent or property crime in Chester is one in 21, and that "Within Pennsylvania, more than 99% of the communities have a lower crime rate than Chester." However, over the past few years, Chester has seen a dramatic decrease in violent crime, with almost a 72% decrease in shootings with victims from 2019 to 2023.

== Religion ==
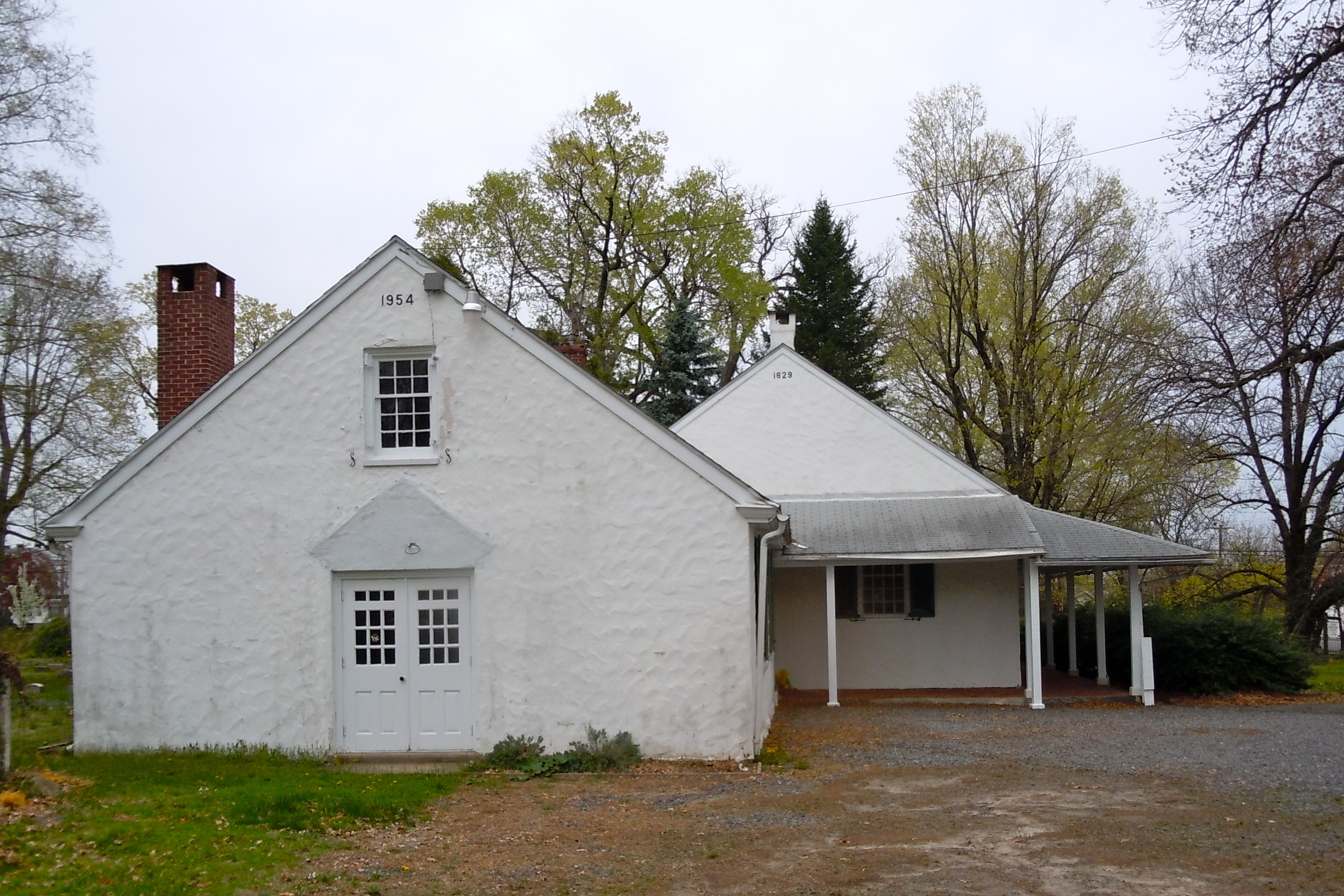
The current Chester Friends Meetinghouse was built in 1829 but the first meetinghouse dates back to 1693.

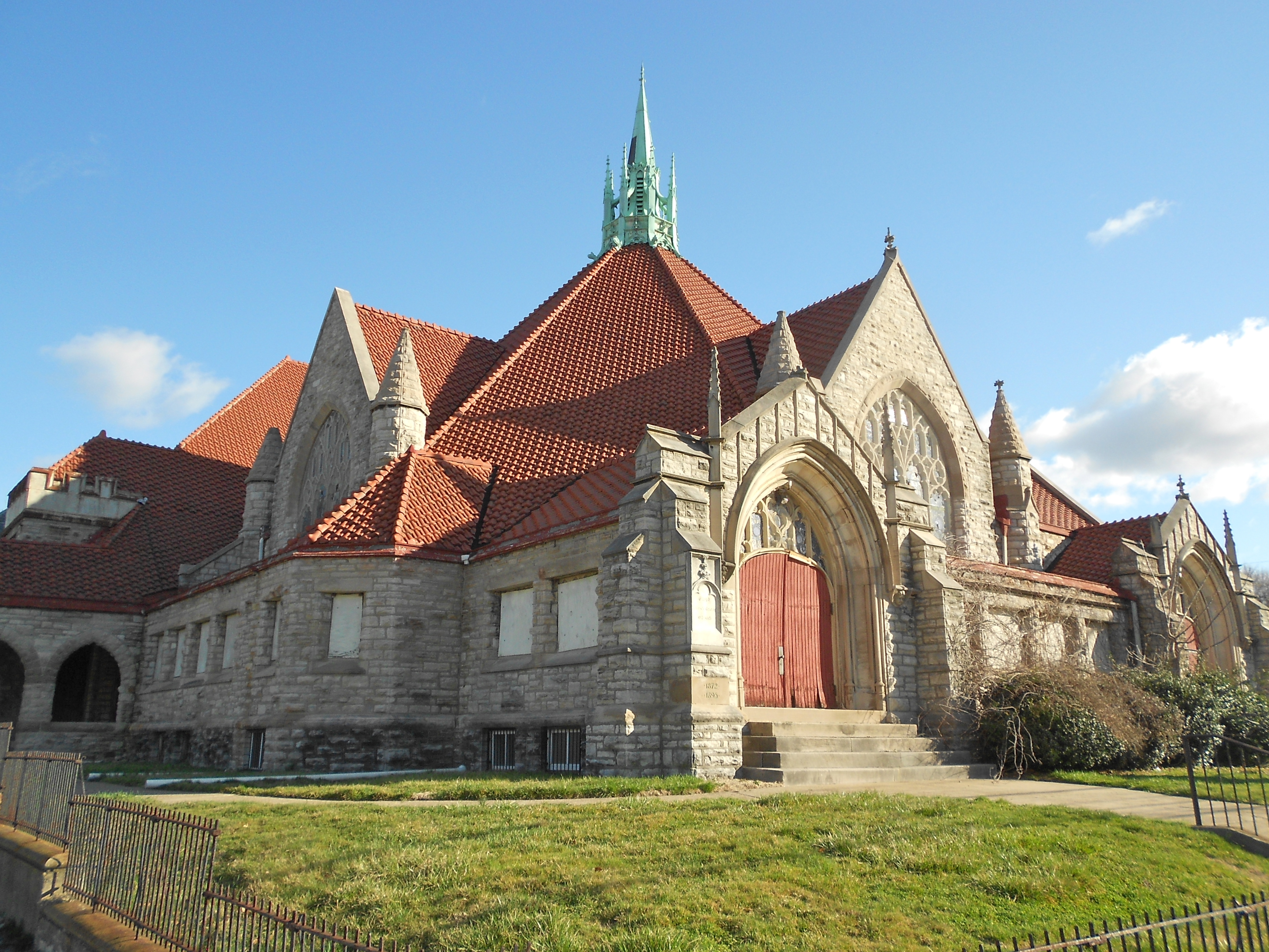
Third Presbyterian Church was the site of the first summer Bible School in 1912

Chester has several churches of historical importance:

- Asbury AME Church - Founded in 1845, it is the second oldest African Methodist Episcopal Church in Chester behind the Union African Methodist Church built in 1832
- Calvary Baptist Church - A Baptist church founded in 1879. Martin Luther King Jr. attended Calvary Baptist when he was a student at Crozer Theological Seminary from 1948 to 1951
- Chester Friends Meetinghouse - The first Quaker meetinghouse was built in 1693 and William Penn was known to speak there
- St. Paul's Church and Old Burial Ground - An Episcopal church originally built in 1702. In 1859, a new church was built on Third Street. In 1900, the current St. Paul's Church was built at 9th and Madison Street. The Old Burial Ground contains the remains of John Morton, signer of the Declaration of Independence; David Lloyd, Chief Justice of the Pennsylvania Colony and Major William Anderson, officer in the Continental Army and U.S. Congressman
- Third Presbyterian Church - A Presbyterian church founded in 1872. It was the location of the first summer bible school in 1912. It was severely damaged by fire in 2020.

St. Katharine Drexel Church is the only Roman Catholic parish remaining in Chester. It is part of the Roman Catholic Archdiocese of Philadelphia and is the result of the conglomeration of six Chester parishes in 1993.

== Points of interest ==
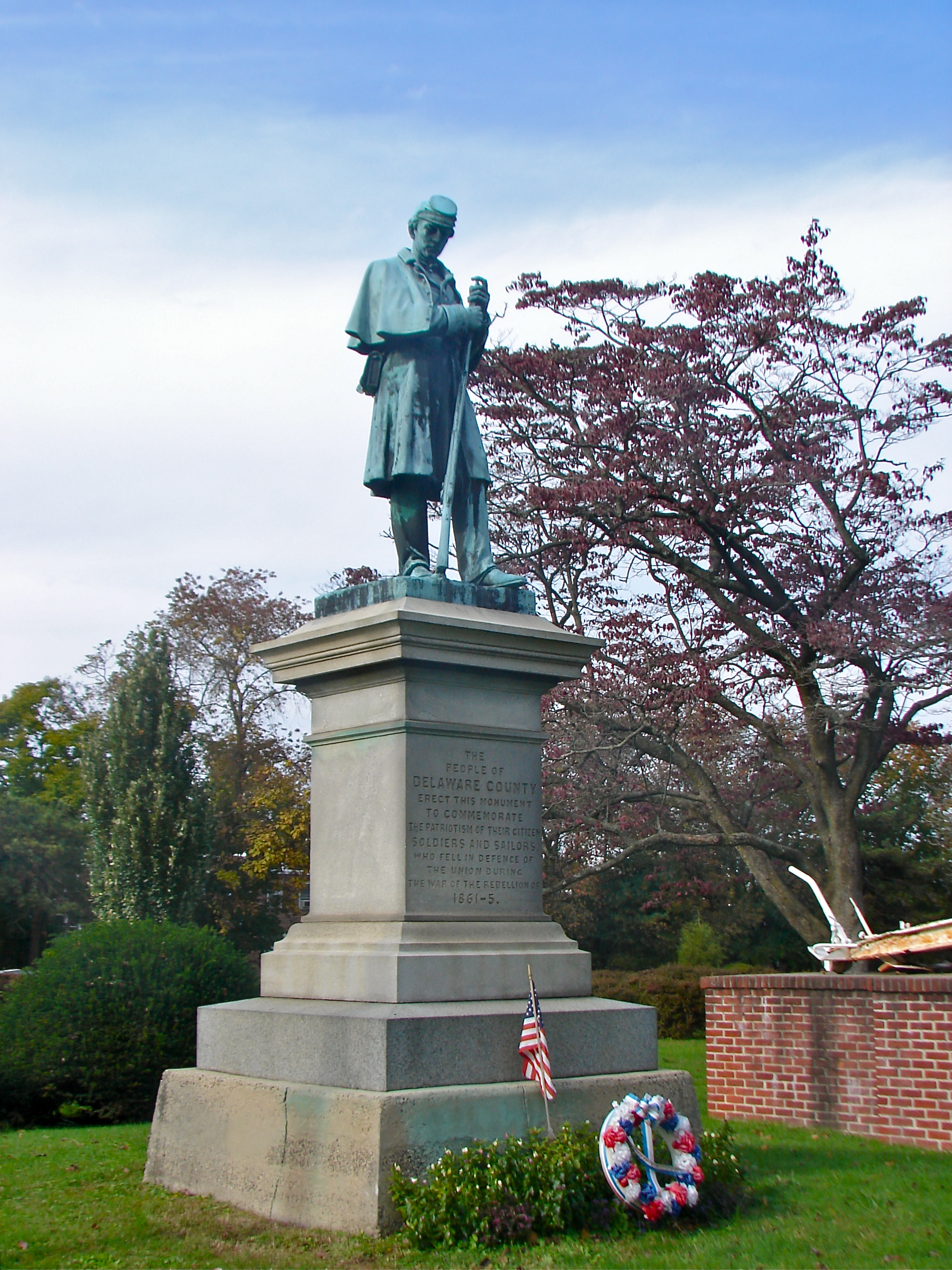
Civil War memorial at Chester Rural Cemetery

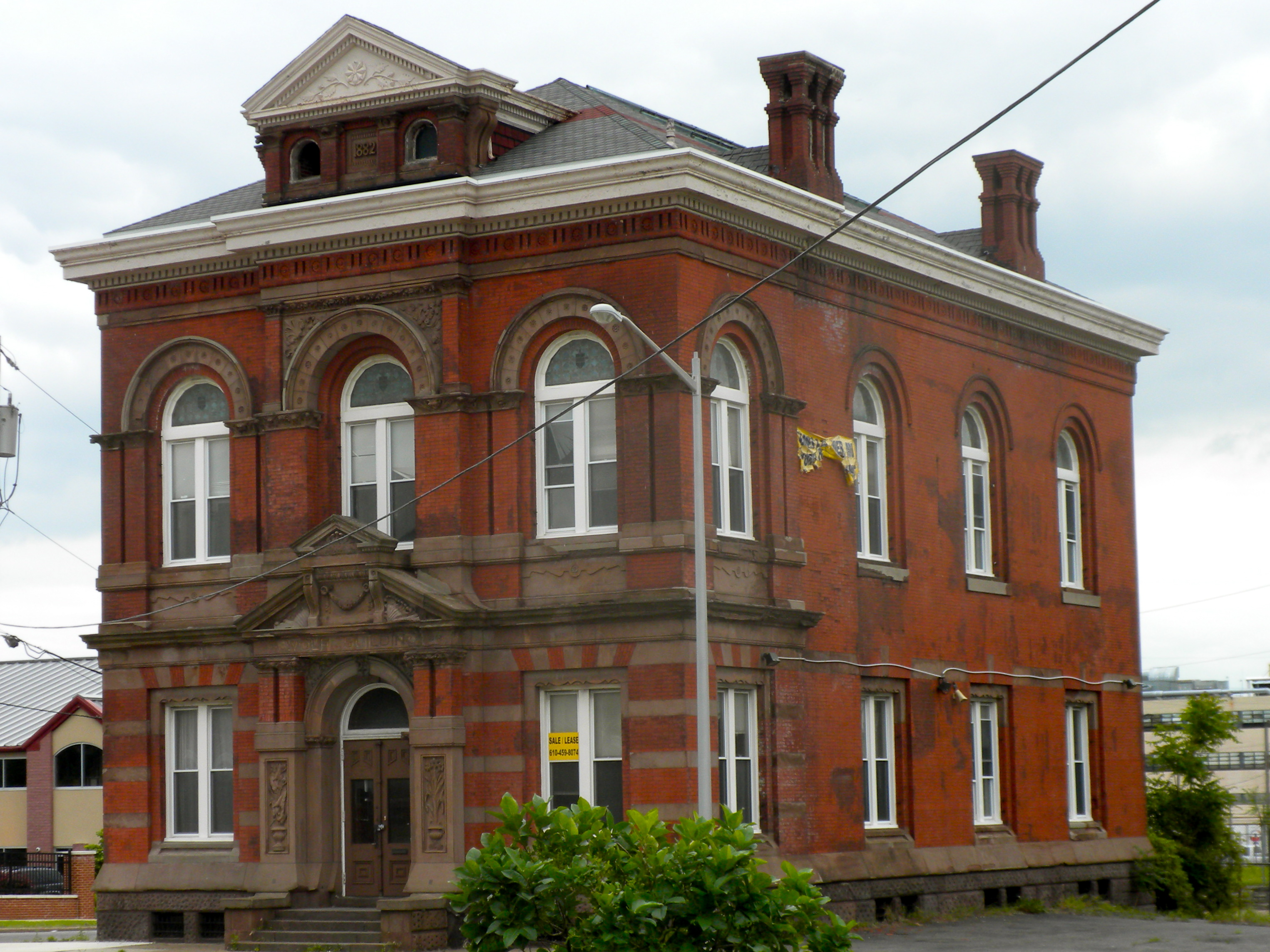
Delaware County National Bank

- 1724 Chester Courthouse
- Asbury AME Church
- Calvary Baptist Church
- Chester Friends Meetinghouse
- Chester Rural Cemetery
- Chester Waterside Station of the Philadelphia Electric Company
- Delaware County National Bank
- Deshong Art Museum
- Deshong Park
- Harrah's Philadelphia Casino & Racetrack
- J. Lewis Crozer Library
- Madison Street Methodist Episcopal Church
- Old Main and Chemistry Building
- St. Paul's Church and Old Burial Ground
- Subaru Park
- Third Presbyterian Church
- Widener University
- William Penn Landing Site

== See also ==
- USS Chester, 2 ships

Preceded by none	County seat of Chester County; 1682–1786	Succeeded by West Chester

Preceded by none	County seat of Delaware County; 1789–1851	Succeeded by Media
