= Asbury AME Church =

African Methodist Episcopal Church in Chester, Pennsylvania

Coordinates: 39°51′46.2″N 75°21′38.2″W

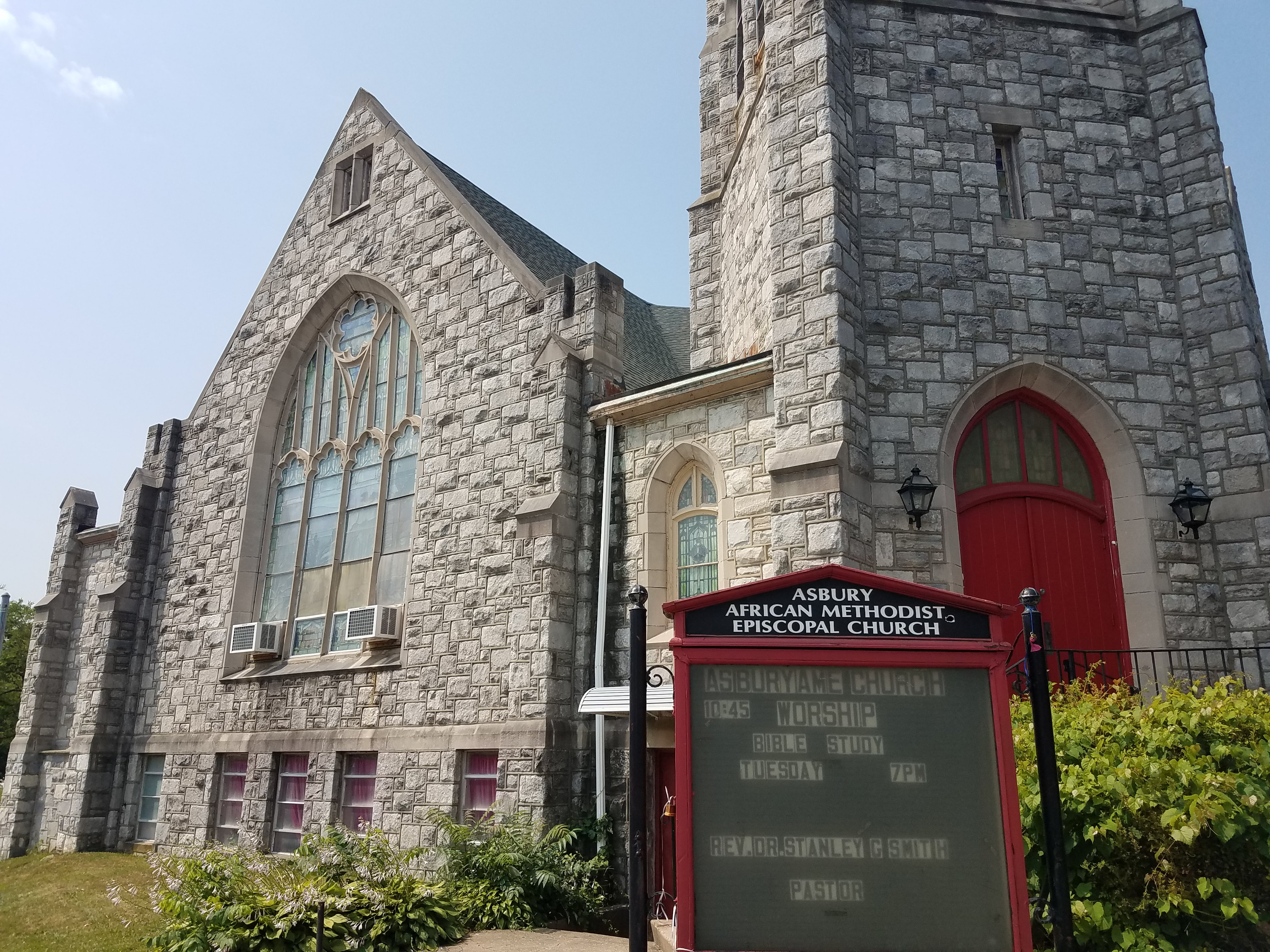
Asbury African Methodist Episcopal Church in 2018

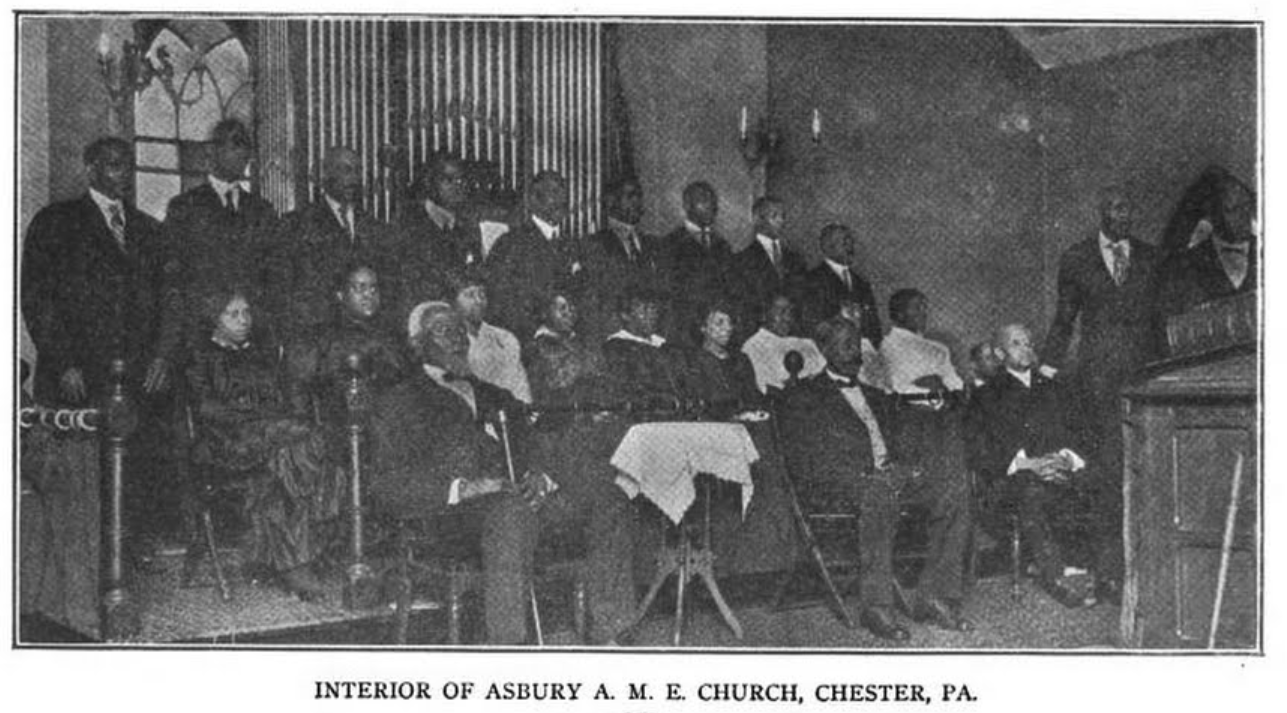
Interior of Asbury AME Church

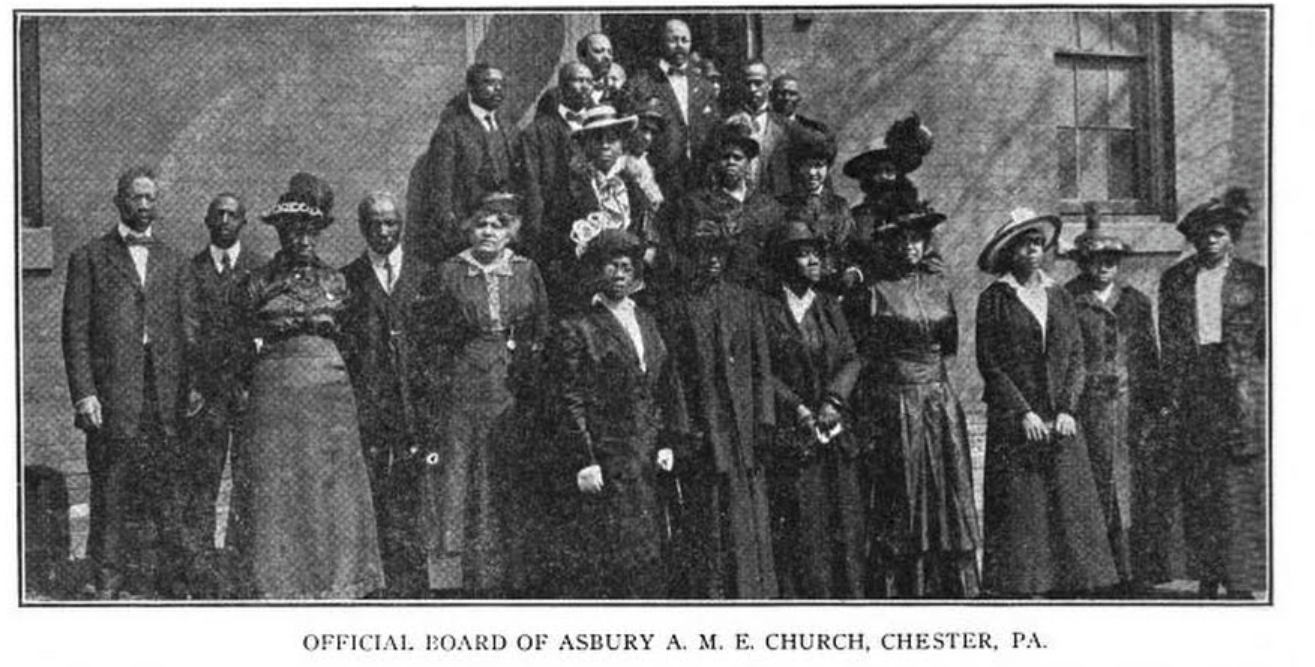
Official Board of Asbury AME Church

Asbury AME Church is an African Methodist Episcopal Church founded in 1845 in Chester, Delaware County, Pennsylvania, United States. It is the second African Methodist Episcopal church founded in Chester behind the Union African Methodist Church in 1832. Asbury AME Church is located at 1712 Providence Avenue and is an active worship center.

== History ==
Reverend Stephen Smith of Philadelphia was the founder of Asbury African Methodist Episcopal Church which he organized on October 26, 1845. The church was originally a frame building located on the east side of Market Street between Second and Third Streets.

In 1846, William Murphy and his wife came to Asbury AME Church with the certificate from Bethel Church in Baltimore, Maryland.

In 1863, during the ministry of Reverend Jeremiah Young, the church was rebuilt and the congregation chose to rename the church Asbury to honor Francis Asbury, the English missionary who founded the Independent Methodist Episcopal Church in America.

On November 25, 1867, the Asbury Methodist Episcopal Church was incorporated by the court of Delaware County.

In 1889, the church building on 2nd and Bevan Street was sold and services were held at James Hall on Fifth and Edgemont Avenue until a new structure was built in 1890.

In 1995, the church property at 2nd and Bevan was sold. The United Methodist Church at 1712 Providence Avenue was purchased and became the new home of Asbury AME Church in 1996.

== Notable people associated with Asbury AME Church ==
AverySunshine sang at Asbury AME Church with the award-winning Wilmington/Chester Mass Choir.
