= Chester Friends Meetinghouse =

Quaker meeting house in Pennsylvania, United States

Coordinates: 39.869409°N 75.363818°W

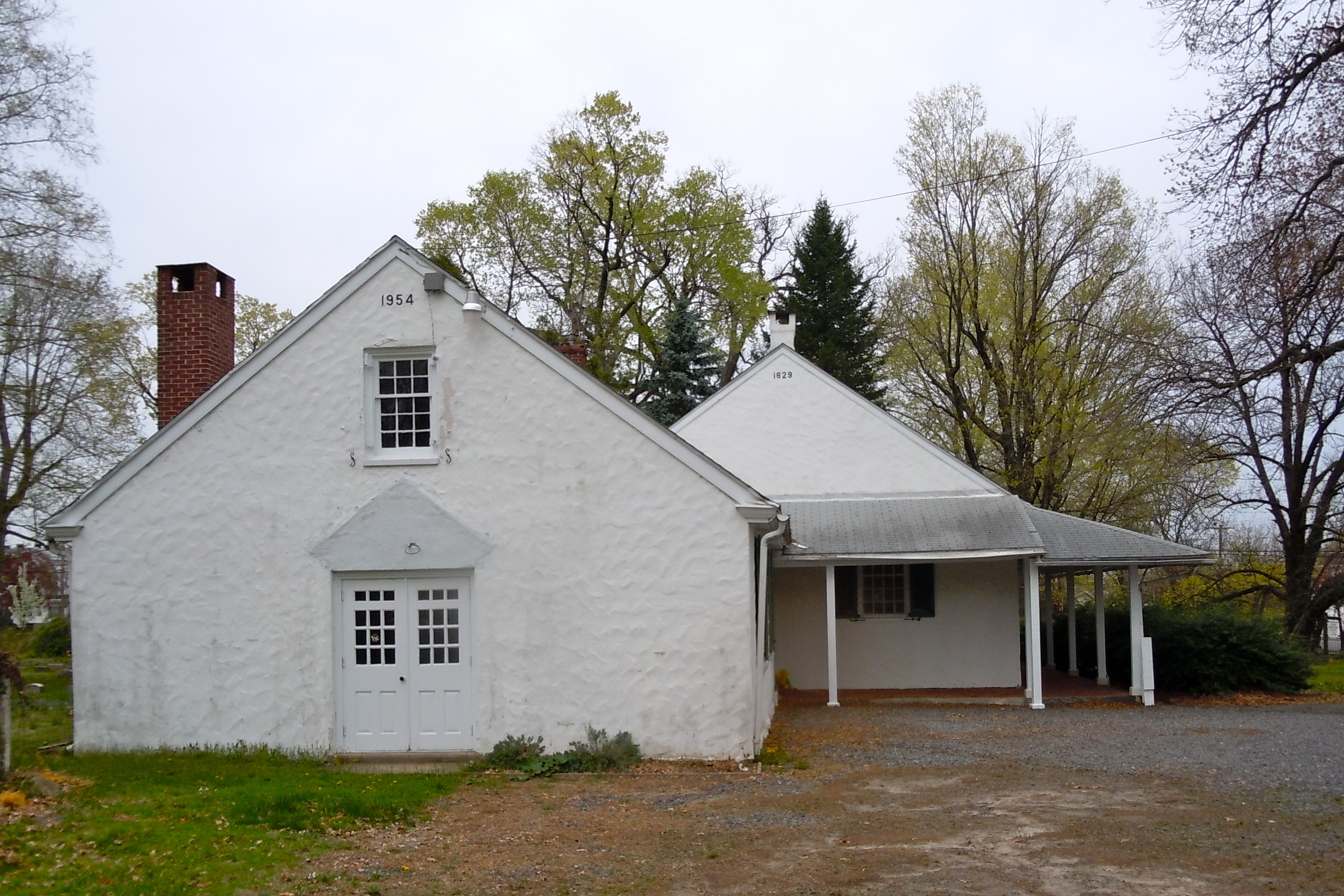
Chester Friends Meetinghouse in 2011

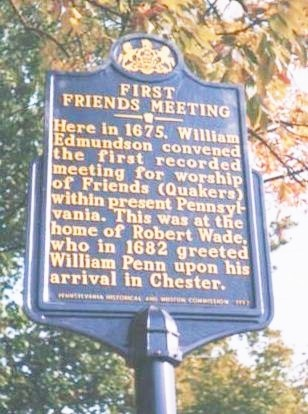
Pennsylvania Historical Marker highlighting the significance of Chester Friends Meetinghouse

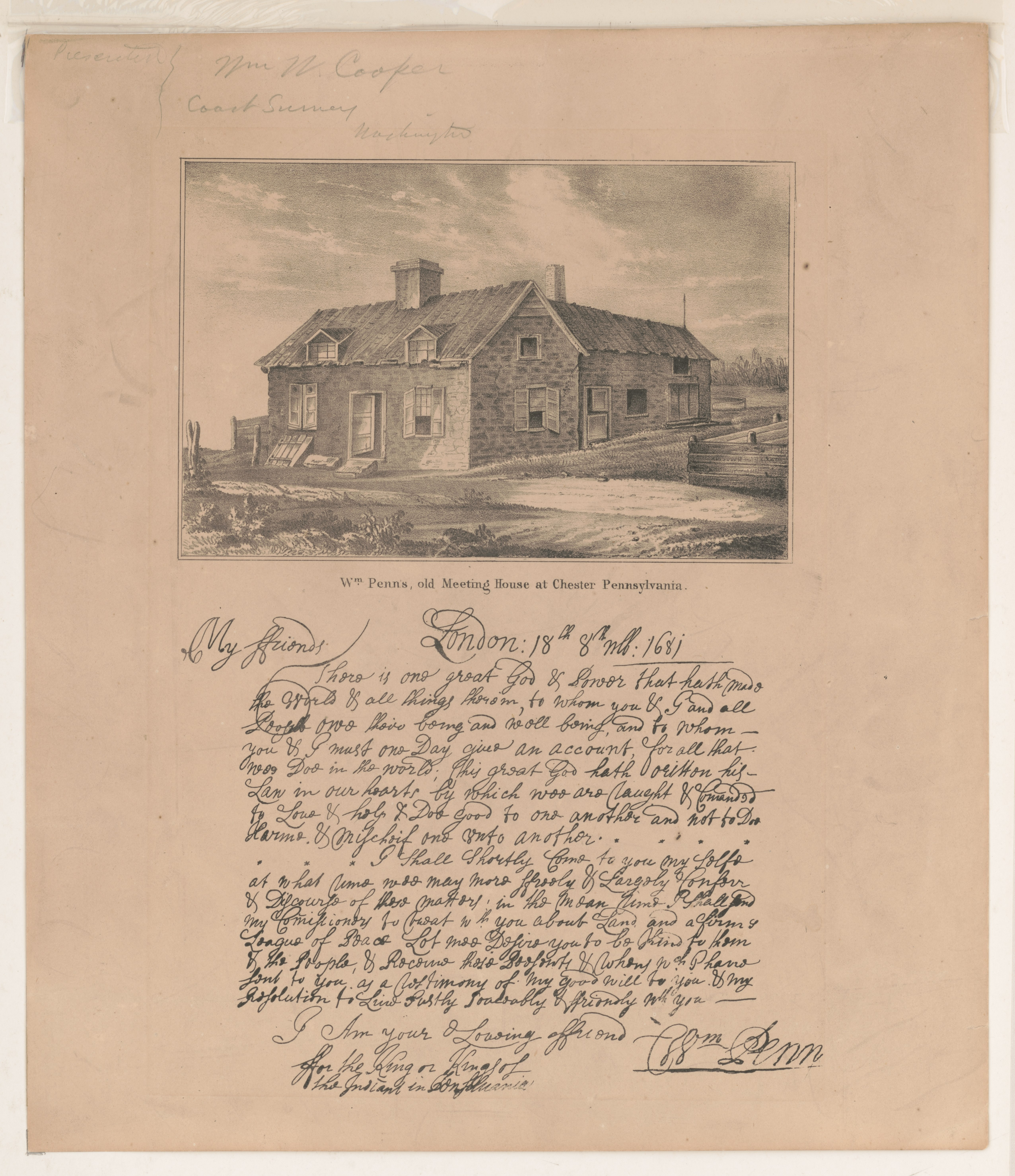
Lithograph of William Penn's old meeting house at Chester Pennsylvania

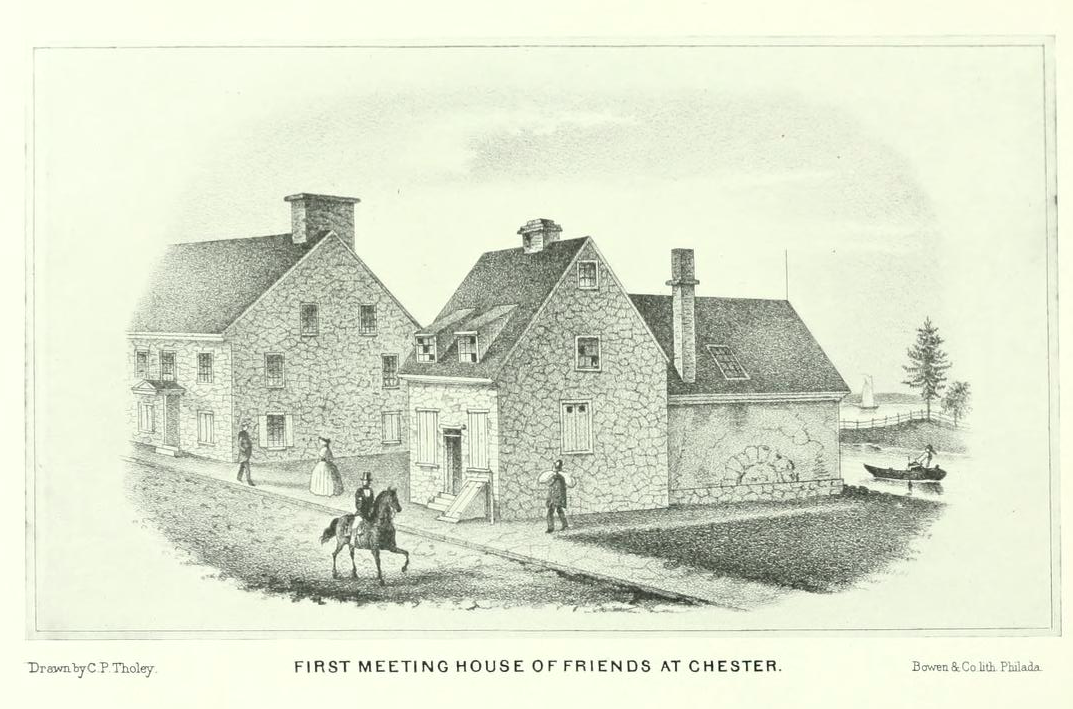
Sketch of First Meetinghouse of Friends at Chester from John Jordan's History of Delaware County, Pennsylvania and its people, 1914

Chester Friends Meetinghouse is a Quaker meeting house at 520 East 24th Street in Chester, Delaware County, Pennsylvania, United States.

The first recorded meeting of Friends in the province of Pennsylvania was in Chester at the house of Robert Wade in 1675. William Edmundson, the founder of Quakerism in Ireland was present at the first meeting.

In 1682, the Chester Friends agreed to hold their meeting at the Chester Court House, also known at the time as the House of Defense.

On January 7, 1687, a lot was purchased on the west side of present-day Edgemont Avenue and construction began on the meetinghouse.

The first Chester Friends Meetinghouse was completed in 1693.

William Penn was known to speak at the original Chester Friends meetinghouse.

In 1735, after forty-three years of worship at the original building, a larger meetinghouse was built on the same property.

The existing buildings have 1829 and 1954 represented on them indicating the date of construction of the current buildings.

The Chester Friends meetinghouse is an active worship center.

== Notable burials ==
- John Chew Thomas (1764-1836) - U.S. Congressman from Maryland
