= DeShong =

DeShong, also spelt Deshong, is a surname. Notable people with the surname include:

- Alfred O. Deshong (1837–1913), American industrialist, philanthropist, and art collector
- Andrea DeShong (born 1962), American boxer
- Jimmie DeShong (1909–1993), American professional baseball pitcher
- John O. Deshong (1807–1881), American businessman and banker
- Michelle Deshong, Aboriginal Australian political scientist and advocate for gender equality
- Peter Deshong (1781–1827), American businessman and banker

== See also ==
- Deshong Art Museum, former art museum in Chester, Pennsylvania
- Deshong Park, a park in Chester, Pennsylvania.
