= Deshong Park =

Park in Chester, Pennsylvania

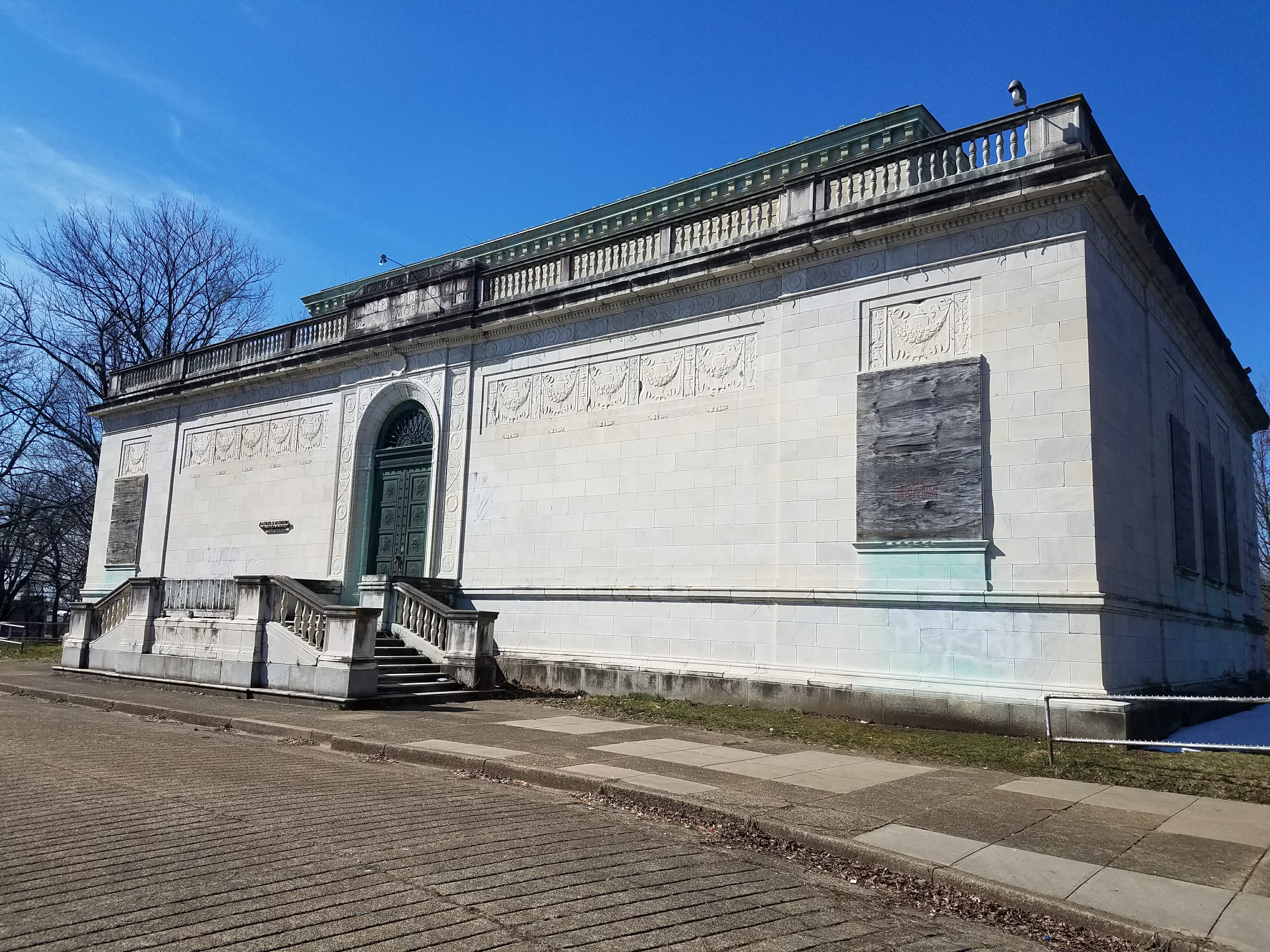
- Interactive map of Deshong Park
- Location: Ninth Street and Edgemont Avenue, Chester, Pennsylvania
- Coordinates: 39°51′14″N 75°21′45″W
- Created: 1913

Deshong Park is a 22 acres (8.9 ha) park in Chester, Pennsylvania. It was established in 1913 on land donated to the city by wealthy businessman Alfred O. Deshong after his death. The donation of his property, mansion and art collection would be valued at over $24 million today. The park contained the Deshong Art Museum and the Deshong mansion. The museum building hosted the art collection and was used as a library from 1961 to 1978. However it fell into disrepair and suffered theft of the art collection. In 1984, the trust that managed the park and properties was dissolved and ownership was given to the Delaware County Industrial Development Authority. The art collection was moved to Widener University and the museum building was shuttered. The Deshong mansion fell into disrepair, suffered a partial collapse in 2013, and was demolished in 2014. The park has fallen into disrepair, suffered from crime and in 2018, 60% of the park was sold for commercial development.

== Description ==
Deshong Park is 22 acres (8.9 ha) in size and located near Ninth Street and Edgemont Avenue in Chester, Pennsylvania. It is adjacent to Eyre Park and separated by Chester Creek. Deshong Boulevard ran through the park near the creek and connected Eighth and Ninth Avenue. The park contained a children's wading pool, tennis courts and athletic fields.

The park has fallen into disrepair and is a daytime meeting spot for many homeless due to a homeless shelter nearby. It has suffered from crime including the rape and stabbing of a woman in 2017 and the discovery of buried human remains in 2022.

== History ==
Alfred O. Deshong was a wealthy businessman who operated a successful quarry business and was a director of the Delaware County National Bank. He invested his fortune in the collection of art. He died in 1913 with no heirs and donated his 22 acres (8.9 ha) property, mansion and art collection to the city of Chester. At current valuations, the donation would be worth $24 million.

A clock tower was added to the park in 1958 and it was refurbished in 2019.

In 2018, 60% of the park was sold for commercial development.

=== Art museum ===
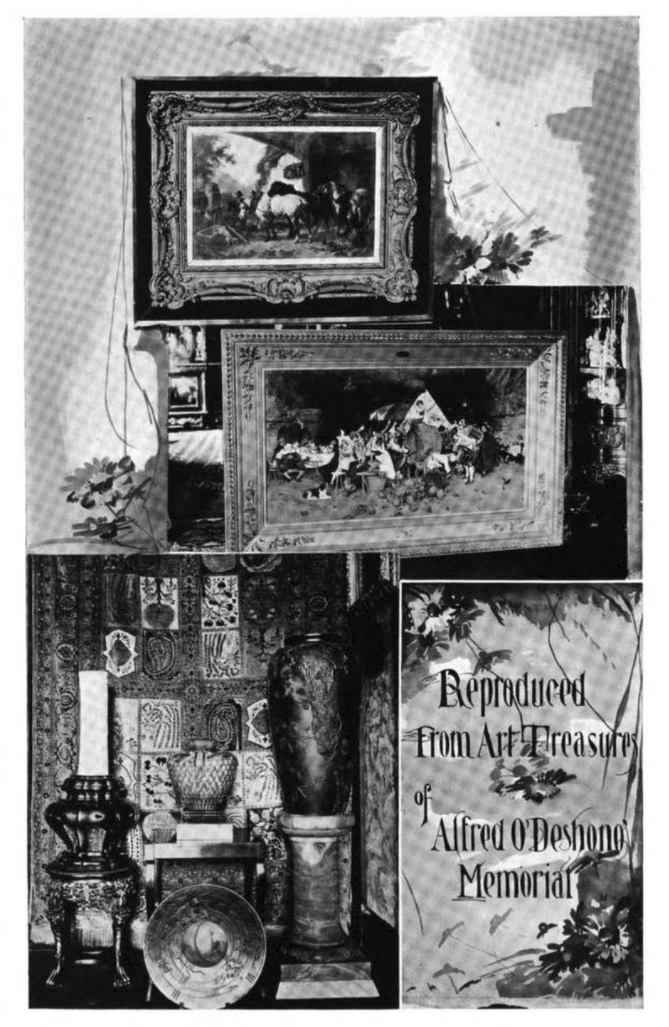
Art Treasures of the Deshong Art Museum

The Deshong Art Museum was built in the park in 1914. It housed over 300 pieces of art including carved Japanese ivory figures, Chinese carved hard stone vessels and 19th century American and European paintings.

From 1961 to 1978, the building was operated as a library, but over the years the museum fell into disrepair and suffered theft of the paintings. In 1977, a 15-year-old boy stole over $450,000 worth of paintings by simply taking them off the wall and sliding them out of the museum's windows.

In 1978, the library was moved to the J. Lewis Crozer Library. Widener University leased the building in 1979 and restored the museum. In July 1984, the remaining trustees that managed the art museum dissolved the trust. The Asian and impressionistic art collection and $500,000 of the trust were given to Widener University where the collection is currently displayed. The museum building and park were taken over by the Delaware County Industrial Development Authority.

=== Deshong mansion ===
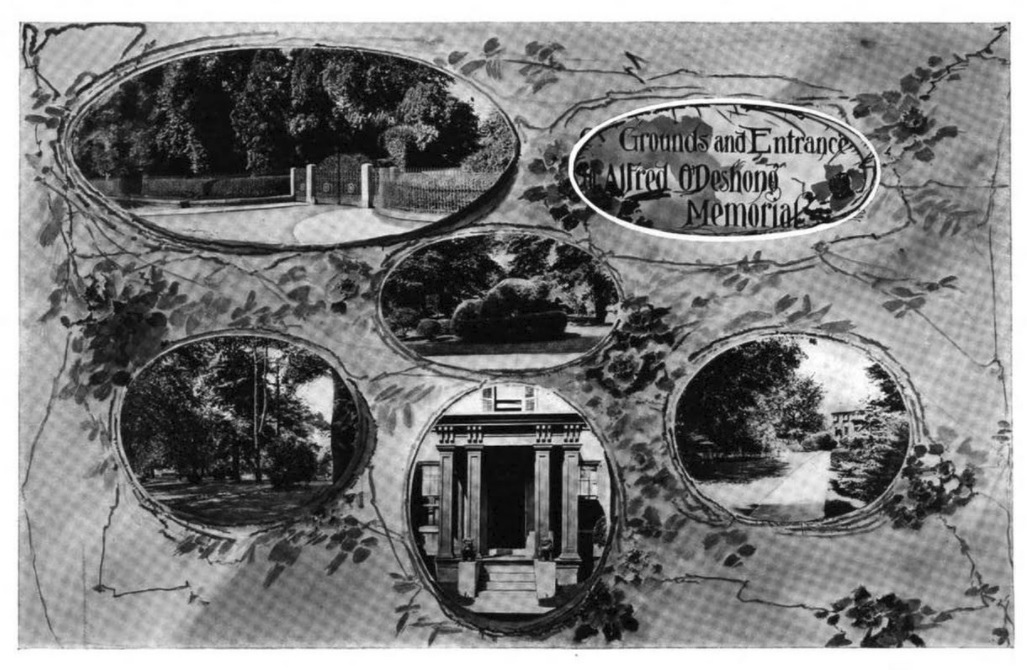
Grounds and Entrance of the Deshong Mansion

The Deshong mansion was built in 1850 on 22 acres (8.9 ha) off Edgemont Avenue in the Greek Revival Italianate style by Alfred's father, John O. Deshong, Sr. In 2013, the mansion suffered a partial collapse and was demolished in 2014.
