= J. Lewis Crozer Library =

Public library in Chester, Pennsylvania

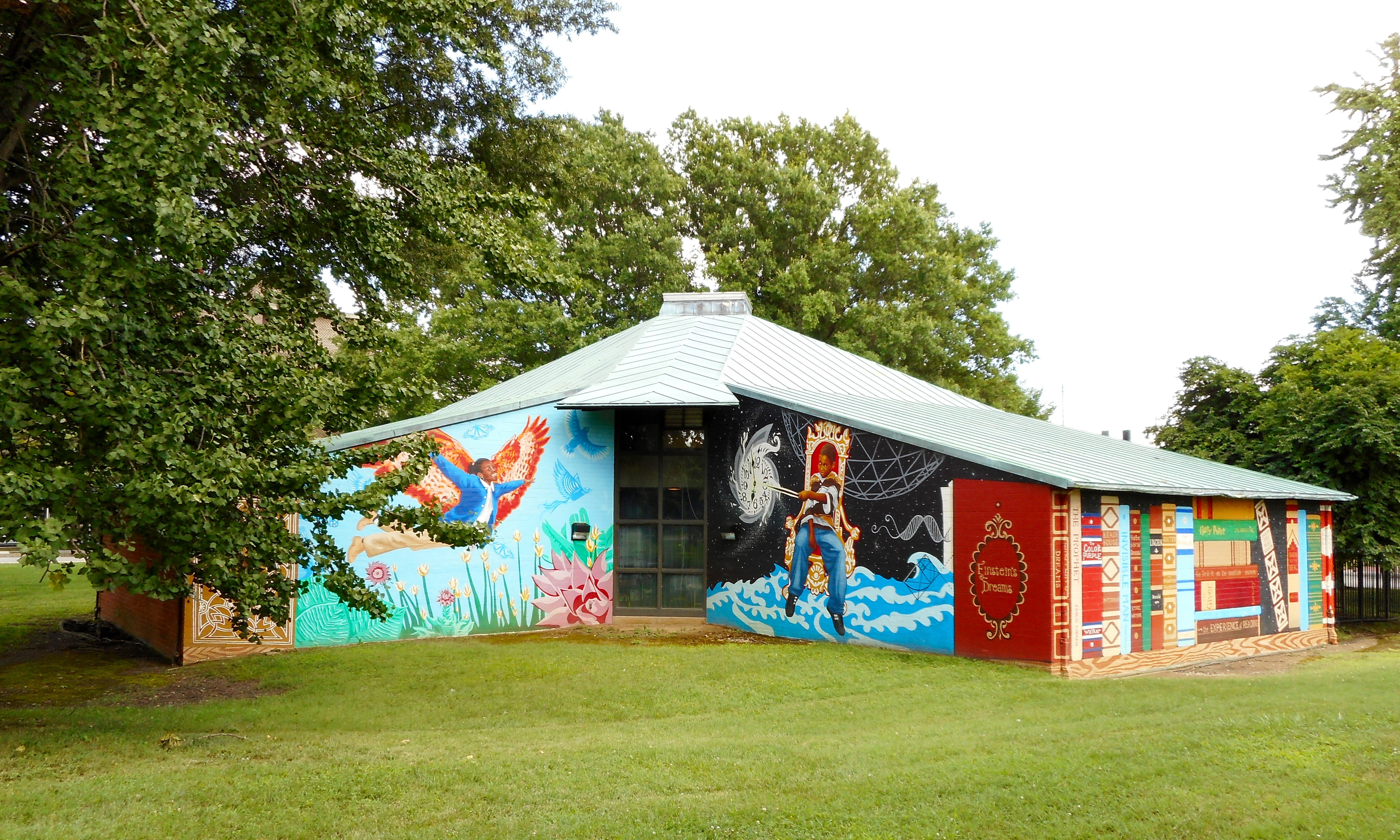
- Exterior of the library in 2017
- 39°50′17″N 75°23′15″W
- Location: 620 Engle Street, Chester, Pennsylvania, U.S.
- Established: 1769; 257 years ago

Other information
- Website: Official website

The J. Lewis Crozer Library is a public library in Chester, Pennsylvania, United States. It was founded in 1769 as one of the earliest libraries established in Pennsylvania. It was chartered as the Chester Library Company in 1830 and reincorporated in 1879 as the Chester Free Library. In 1925, the library was renamed in recognition of a $250,000 gift bequeathed to it by the wealthy philanthropist J. Lewis Crozer. The library occupied several buildings over the years, including the Deshong Art Museum from 1961 to 1978. The current library building was built in 1976 as a neighborhood branch and became the main library in 1978.

== Description ==
The library is located at 620 Engle Street in Chester, Pennsylvania, just north of Martin Luther King Park.

== History ==
The library was founded February 14, 1769, when a group of citizens established a collection of 163 books on the second story of a market house. It was one of the earliest libraries established in Pennsylvania.

In 1830, the Pennsylvania Legislature formed a charter for the library and the name was changed to the Chester Library Company. Interest in the library declined and the collection was stored in a building on 4th Street in 1871. The library was reincorporated in 1876 as the Chester Free Library.

A building on Ninth Street was constructed in 1877 to use for the library and a community center. A wealthy philanthropist, J. Lewis Crozer, bequeathed $250,000 to the library after his death in 1897. The library was renamed the J. Lewis Crozer Library in 1925 in recognition of the gift.

In the 1940s, the library on Ninth Street closed. The Deshong Art Museum in Deshong Park was used as the library from 1961 to 1978. In 1976, the current library was built at 620 Engle Street as a branch to serve the Southern and Western parts of Chester. In 1978, the main library was moved from the Deshong Art Museum to 620 Engle Street.

In 2010, a statue of Martin Luther King Jr., sculpted by Zenos Frudakis, was installed in the Martin Luther King Memorial Park adjacent to the library. The statue is 5 feet (1.5 m) tall and 685 pounds (311 kg).
