= Deshong Art Museum =

Defunct art museum in Chester, Pennsylvania

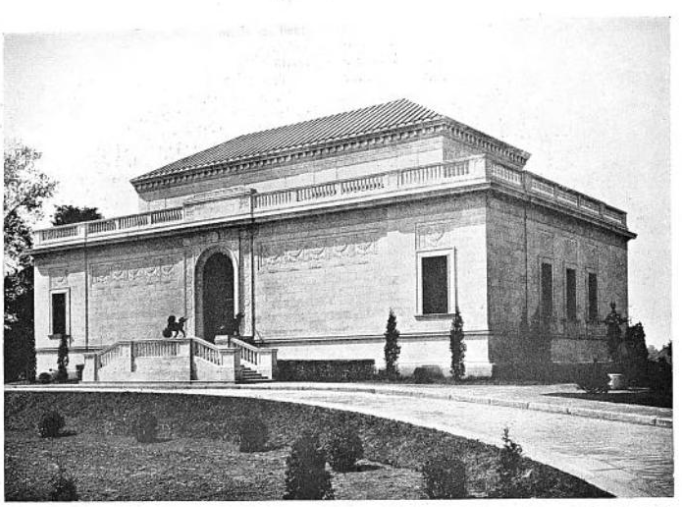
- Image from The Architectural Review Magazine in 1918
- Established: September 30, 1916
- Dissolved: 1984
- Location: Deshong Park, Eleventh Street and Edgemont Avenue, Chester, Pennsylvania, U.S.
- Coordinates: 39°51′16.8″N 75°21′40.6″W
- Type: Art museum

The Deshong Art Museum, also known as the Deshong Memorial Art Gallery, was a public art gallery located in Deshong Park at Eleventh Street and Edgemont Avenue in Chester, Pennsylvania. The building displayed the art collection of wealthy businessman Alfred O. Deshong from 1916 to 1984. He donated his art collection, mansion and 22-acre (8.9 ha) property to the city of Chester after his death. At current valuations, the donation would be worth over US$24 million. Deshong Park was created from his donated property and the museum was built there in 1914. From 1961 to 1978, the building was used as a library but fell into disrepair and suffered theft of the art collection.

In 1979, a teenage boy was convicted of stealing US$300,000 worth of paintings over a three-year period by taking them off the wall and sliding them out of the museum's windows.

The museum trust was dissolved in 1984. The museum building and park were given to the Delaware County Industrial Development Authority and the art collection was moved to Widener University.

== Description ==
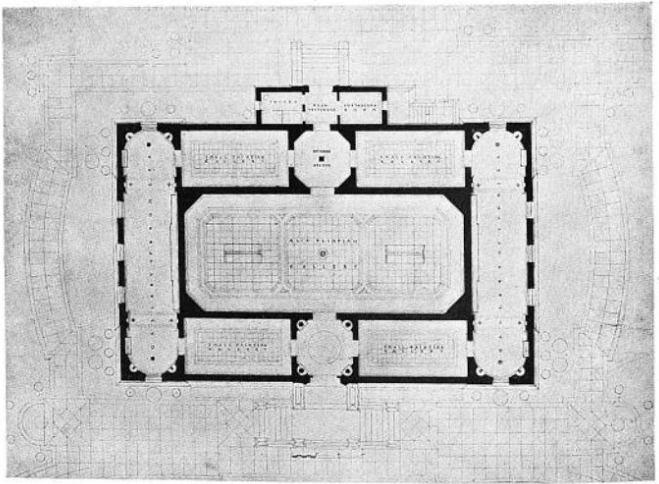
Interior layout of Deshong Art Museum

The building was designed by architects Brazer and Robb. It was designed to be fireproof with bronze doors and Dover marble exterior walls. The German emperor's gallery at Cassel was used as a model for the main gallery. The paintings and rugs that Deshong had collected were displayed in the main gallery which is 25 by 59 feet (7.6 m × 18.0 m) in dimension and 30 feet (9.1 m) high.

It contained over 300 pieces of art including 19th-century American and European paintings, Chinese carved stone jars and Japanese ivory statues. The paintings included those from American Impressionist artists George Loftus Noyes, Edward Redfield and Robert Spencer.

== History ==
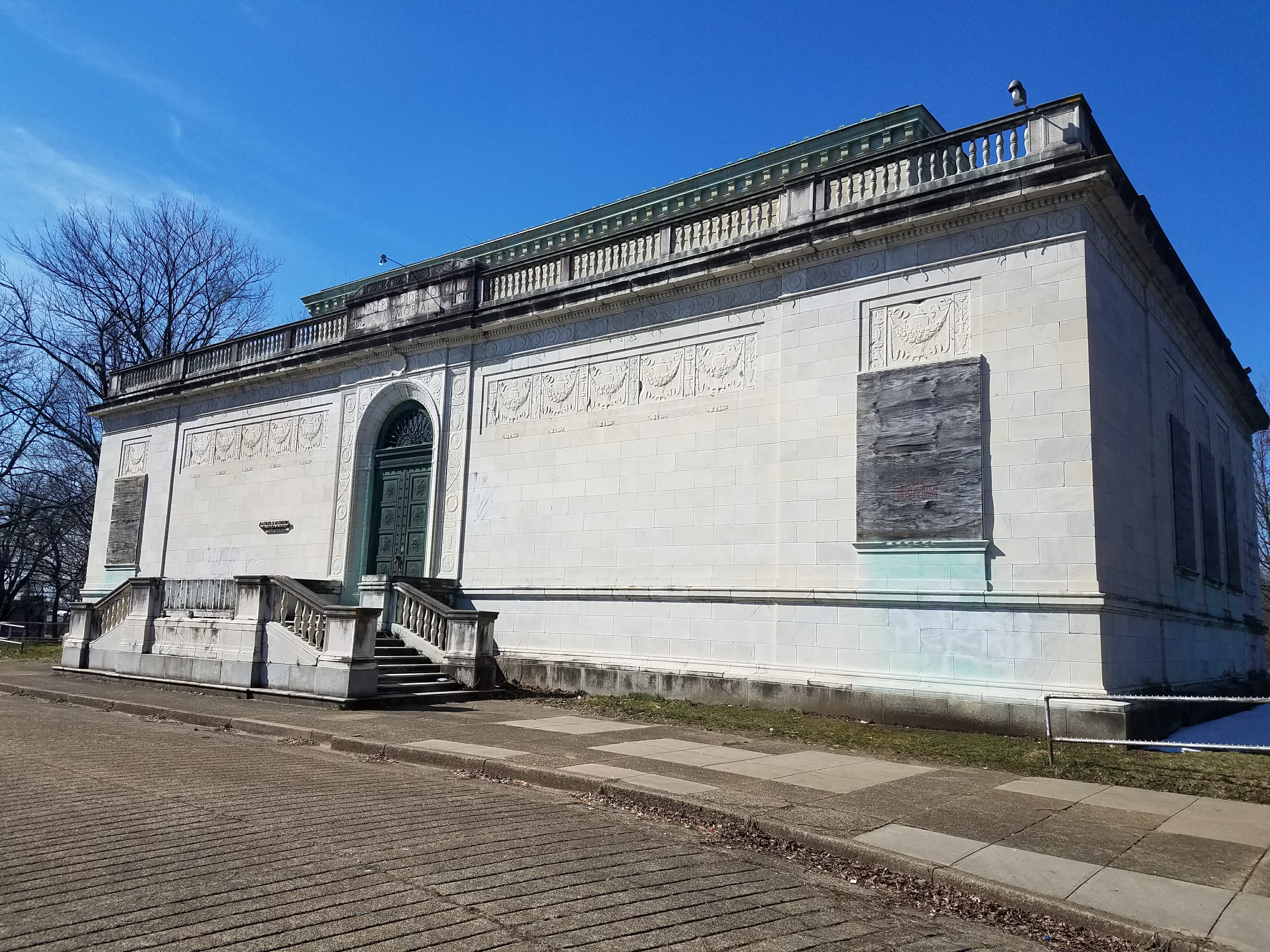
Shuttered museum in 2018

Alfred O. Deshong was a wealthy businessman who operated a successful quarry business and was a director of the Delaware County National Bank. He invested his wealth into a large collection of art. He died in 1913 and donated his art collection, mansion and 22-acre (8.9 ha) property to the city of Chester. In his will, Deshong stipulated that an art gallery should be built to display his art collection. At current valuations, the donation would be worth US$24 million.

Deshong Park was created from the property and the Deshong Art Museum was built in the park. It was formally opened on September 30, 1916. The museum was used as a library from 1961 to 1978 but fell into disrepair. The library was moved to the J. Lewis Crozer Library in 1978.

=== Art theft ===
Between 1976 and 1979, a teenager named Laurence McCall from Chester, Pennsylvania, stole multiple paintings and a plate from the gallery. He would skip school and frequent the museum. The museum had limited security and McCall stole more than 22 paintings by simply taking them off the wall and sliding them out of the museum's windows. Many of the stolen items were sold through Sotheby's in New York City, where he delivered the items personally. McCall was eventually caught in September 1979, when he was 19. He was convicted of stealing US$300,000 worth of art and served three years in federal prison. Most of the art was recovered by authorities.

=== Museum closure ===
The building was leased and restored by Widener University in 1979. In 1984, the museum trust was dissolved and the property was taken over by the Delaware County Industrial Development Authority. US$500,000 of the trust and the art collection was granted to Widener University. The art collection is currently on display at Widener University.

== Gallery ==
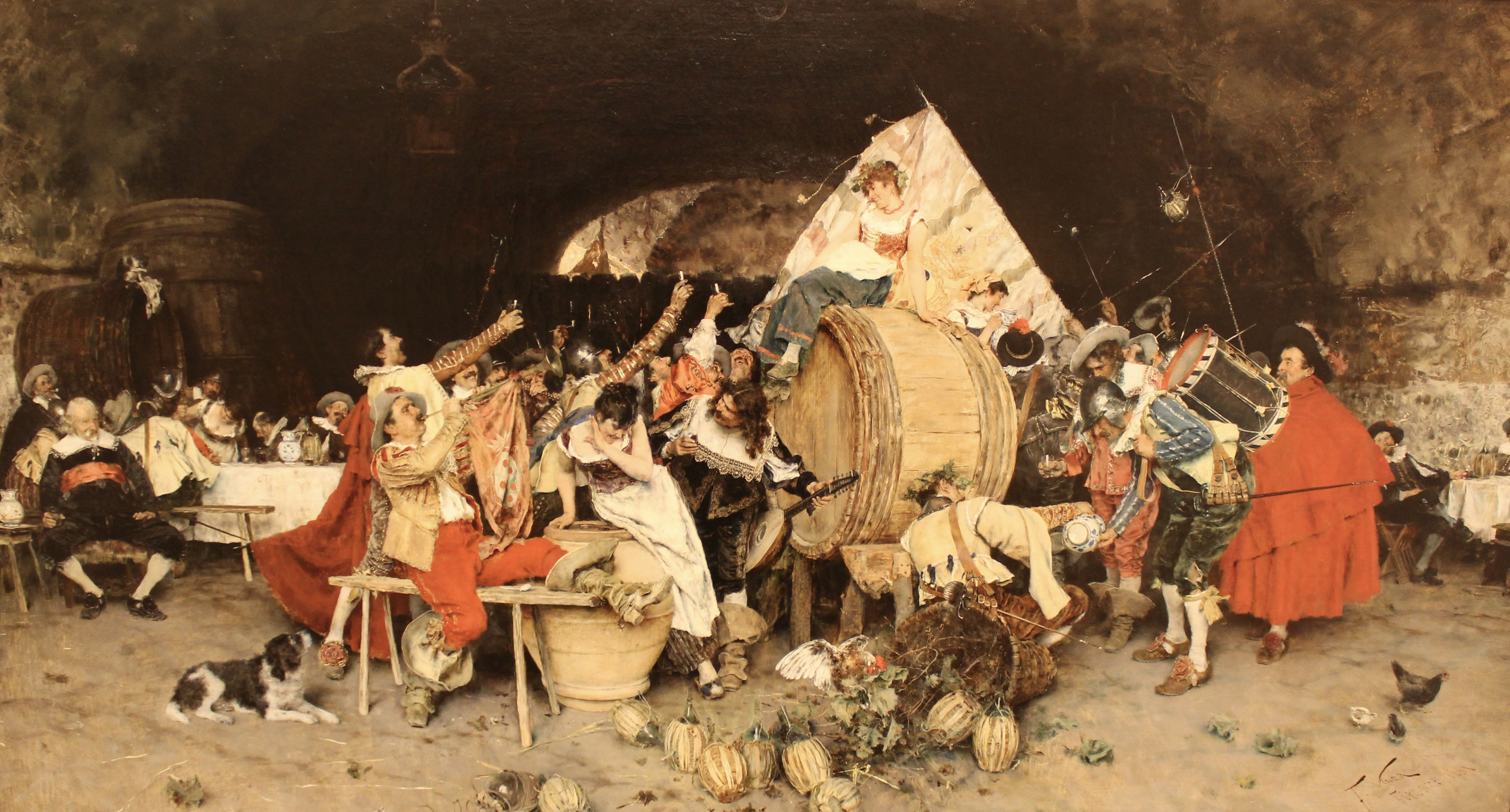
Allan Piu bella by Francesco Vinea

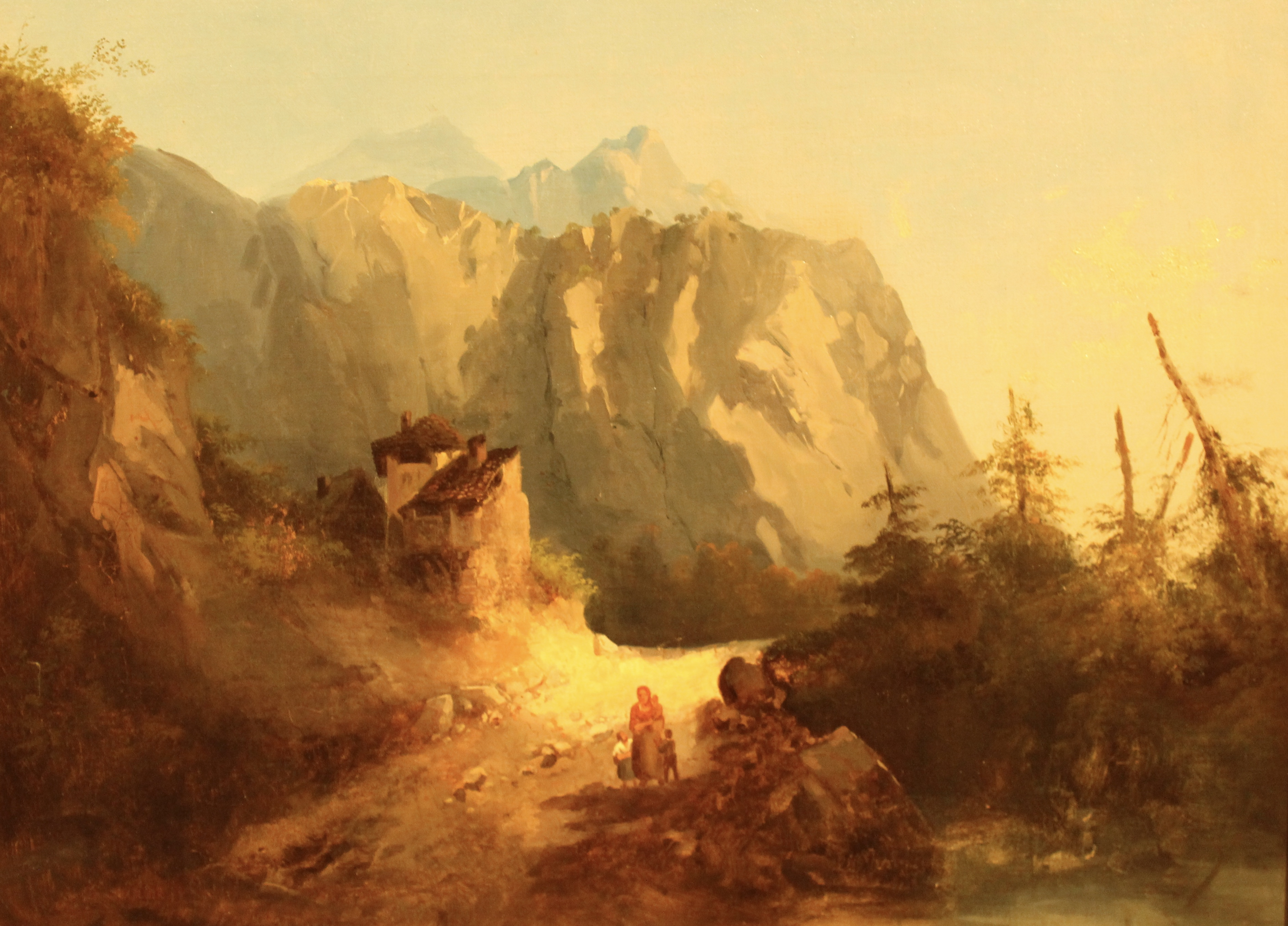
Alpine Mountain Scene by Alexandre Calame

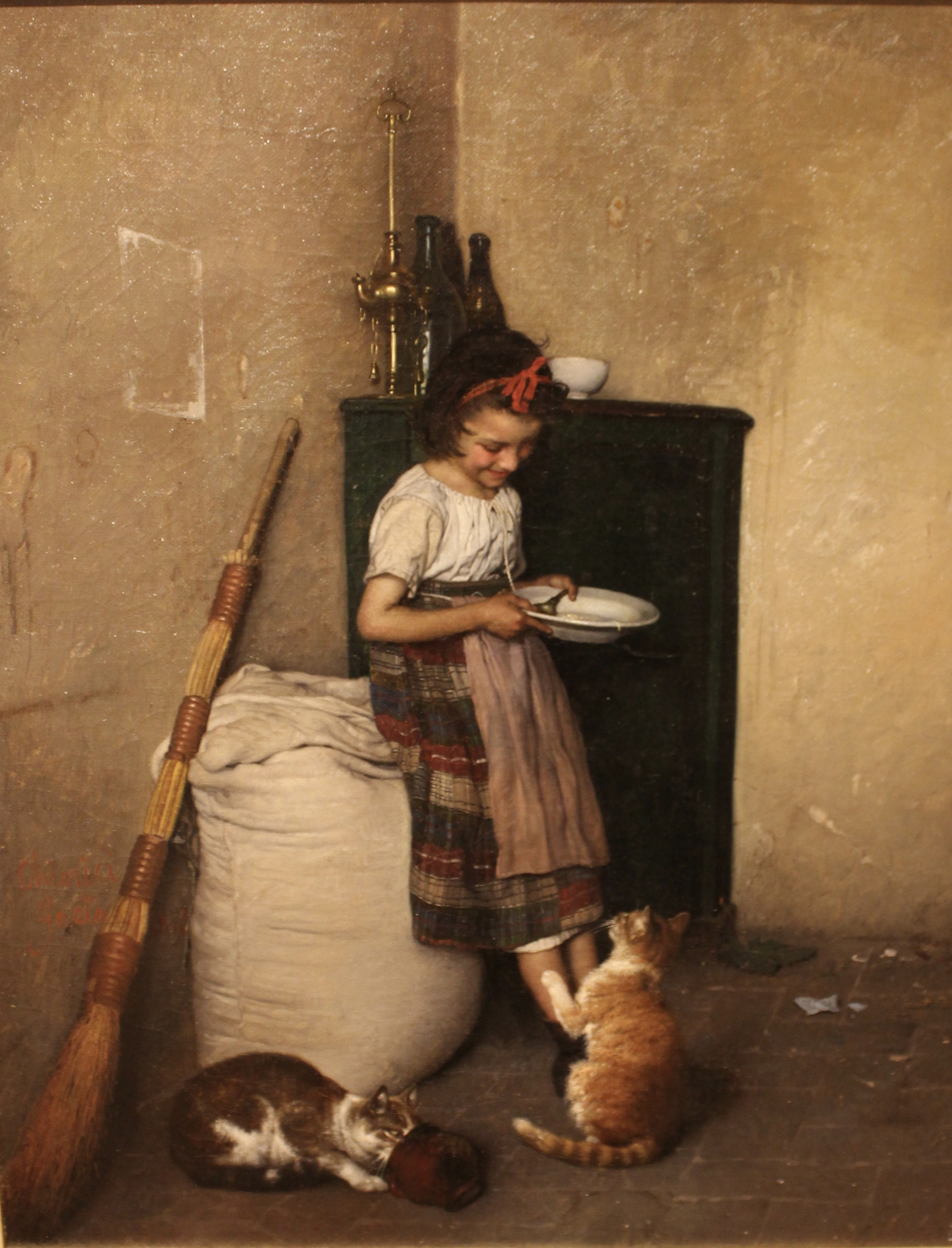
Child Feeding her Pets (1872) by Gaetano Chierici

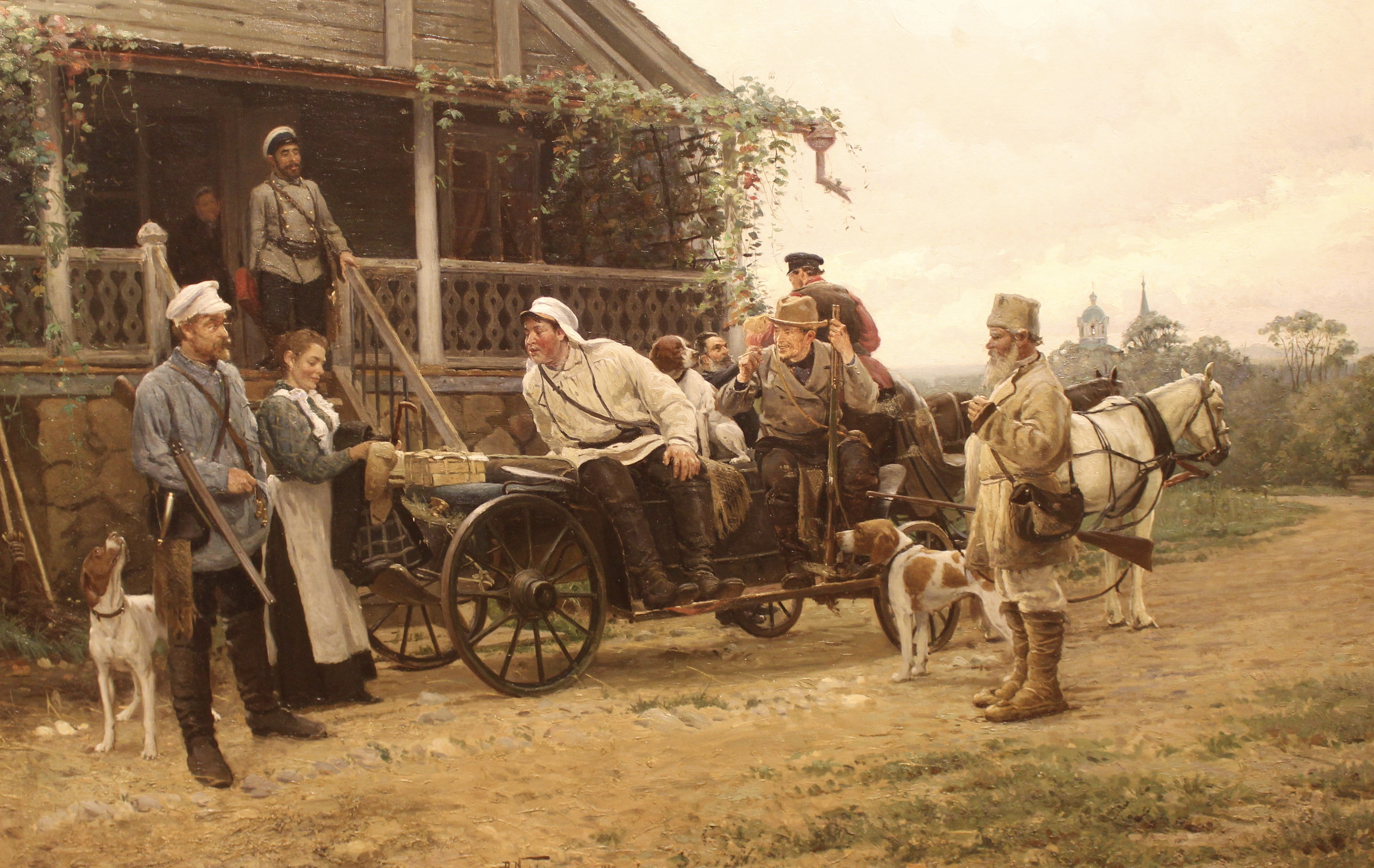
Departure for the Hunt (1899) by Vladimir Makovsky

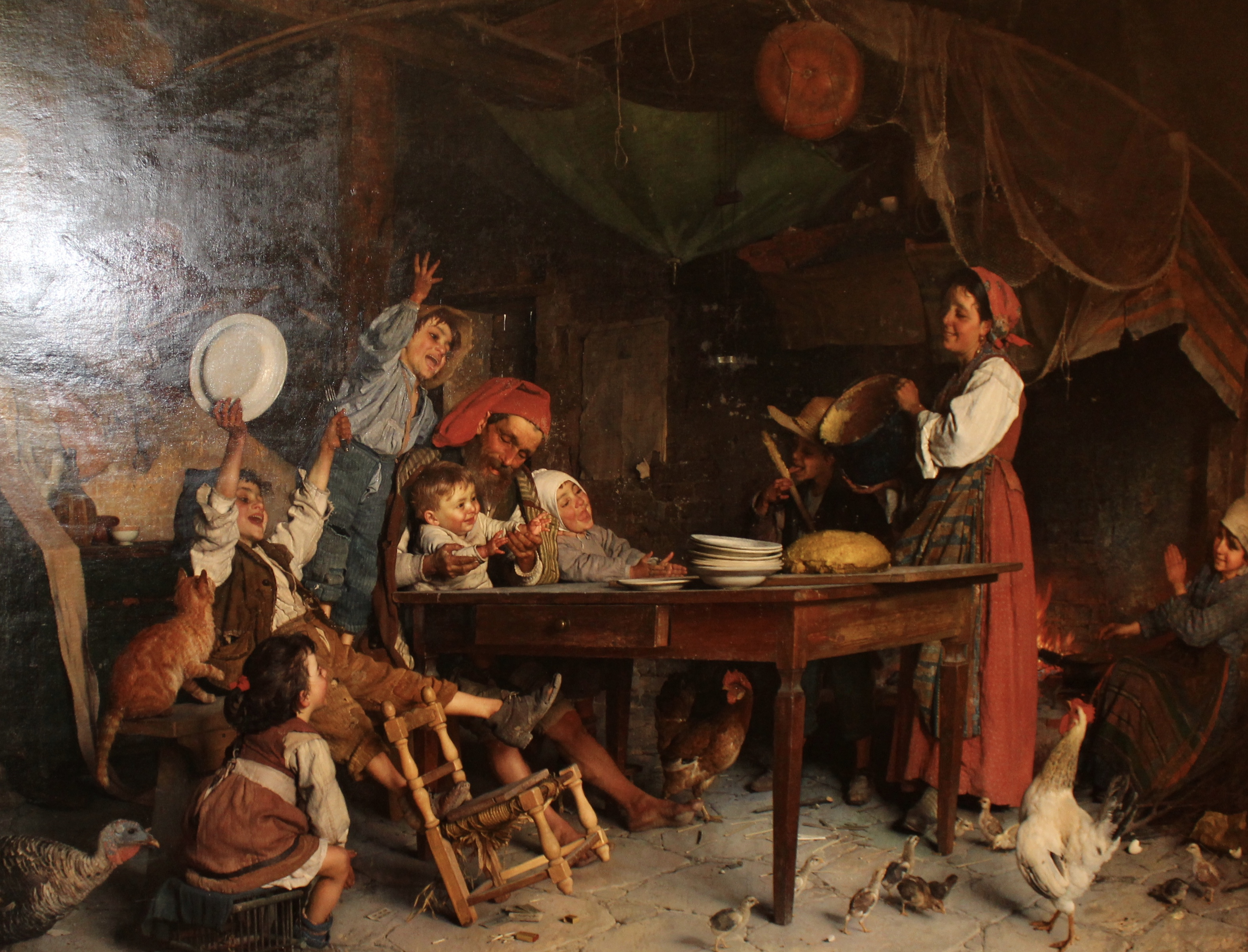
Hasty Pudding (1883) by Gaetano Chierici

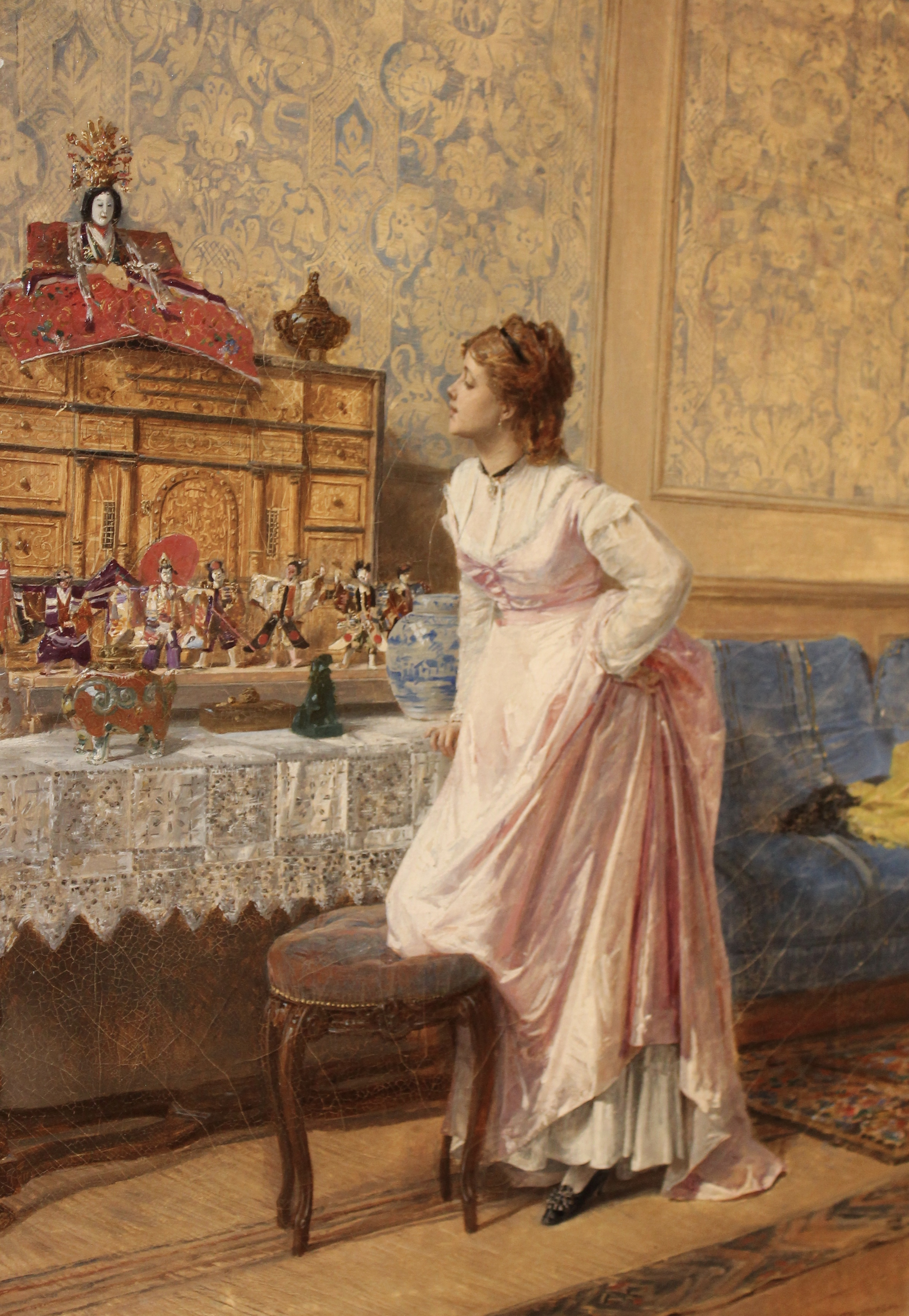
Her Japanese Dolls (1872) by Adrien Moreau

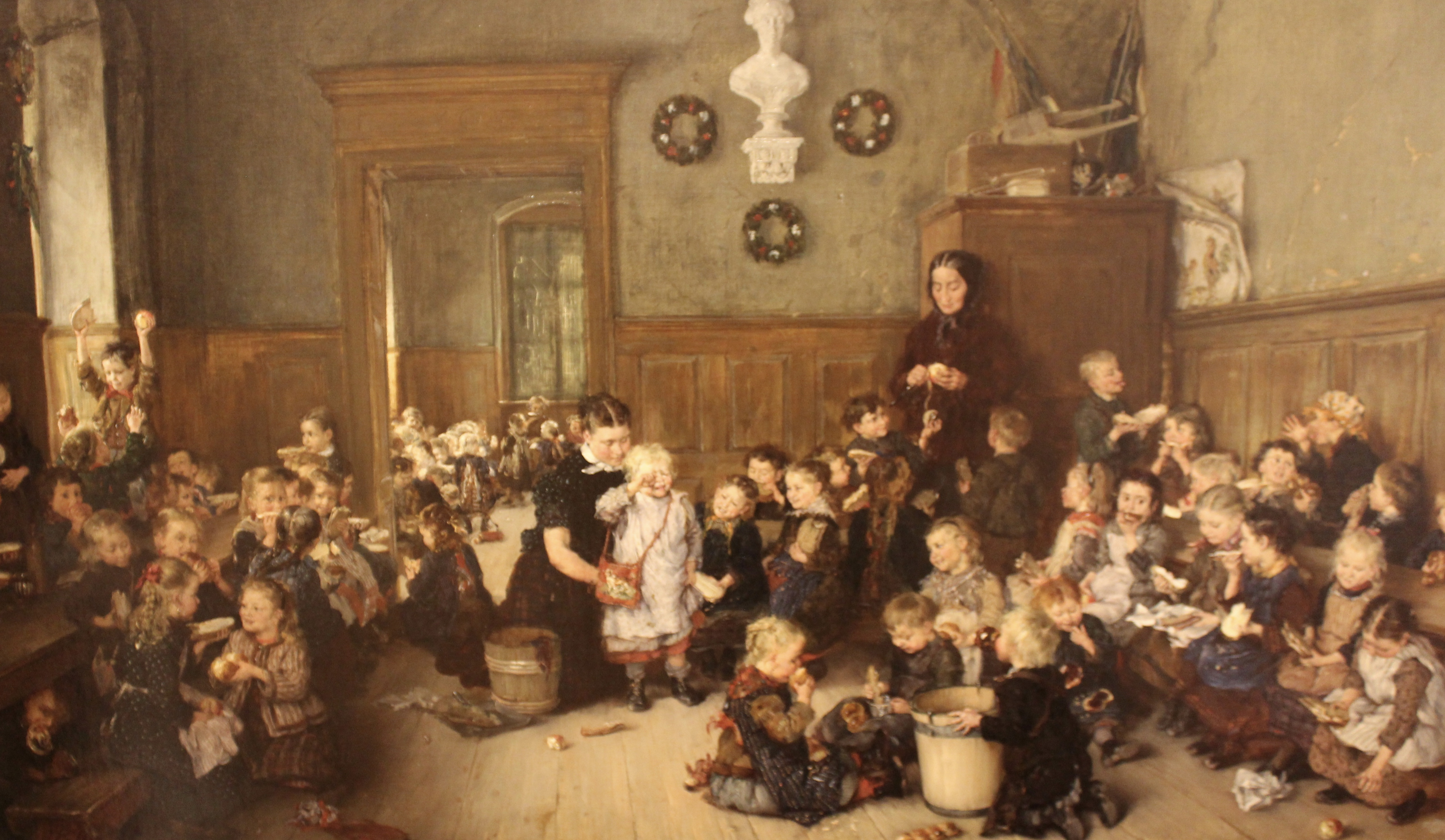
Kindergarten by Otto Piltz

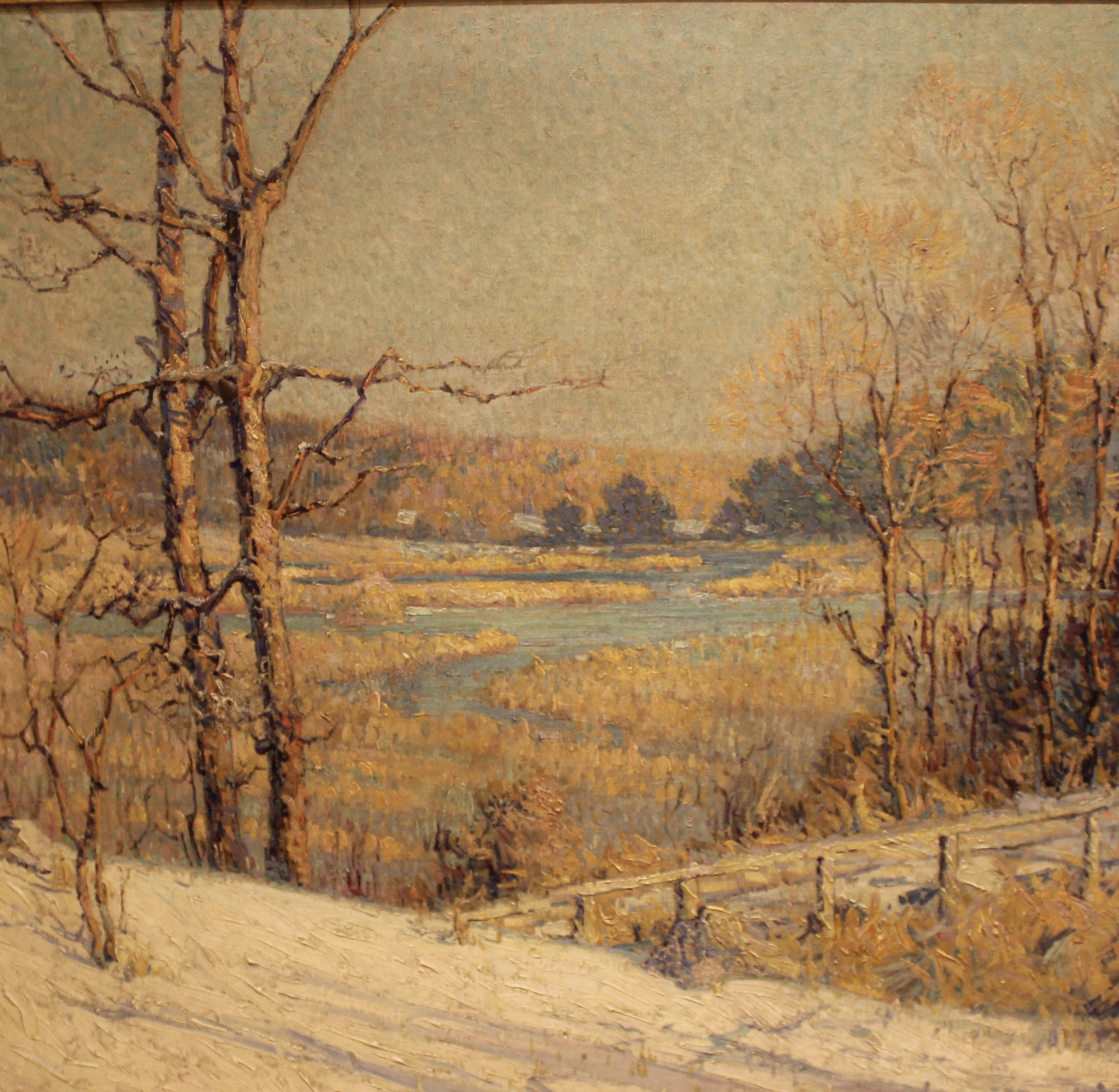
Meadows in Winter by George Loftus Noyes

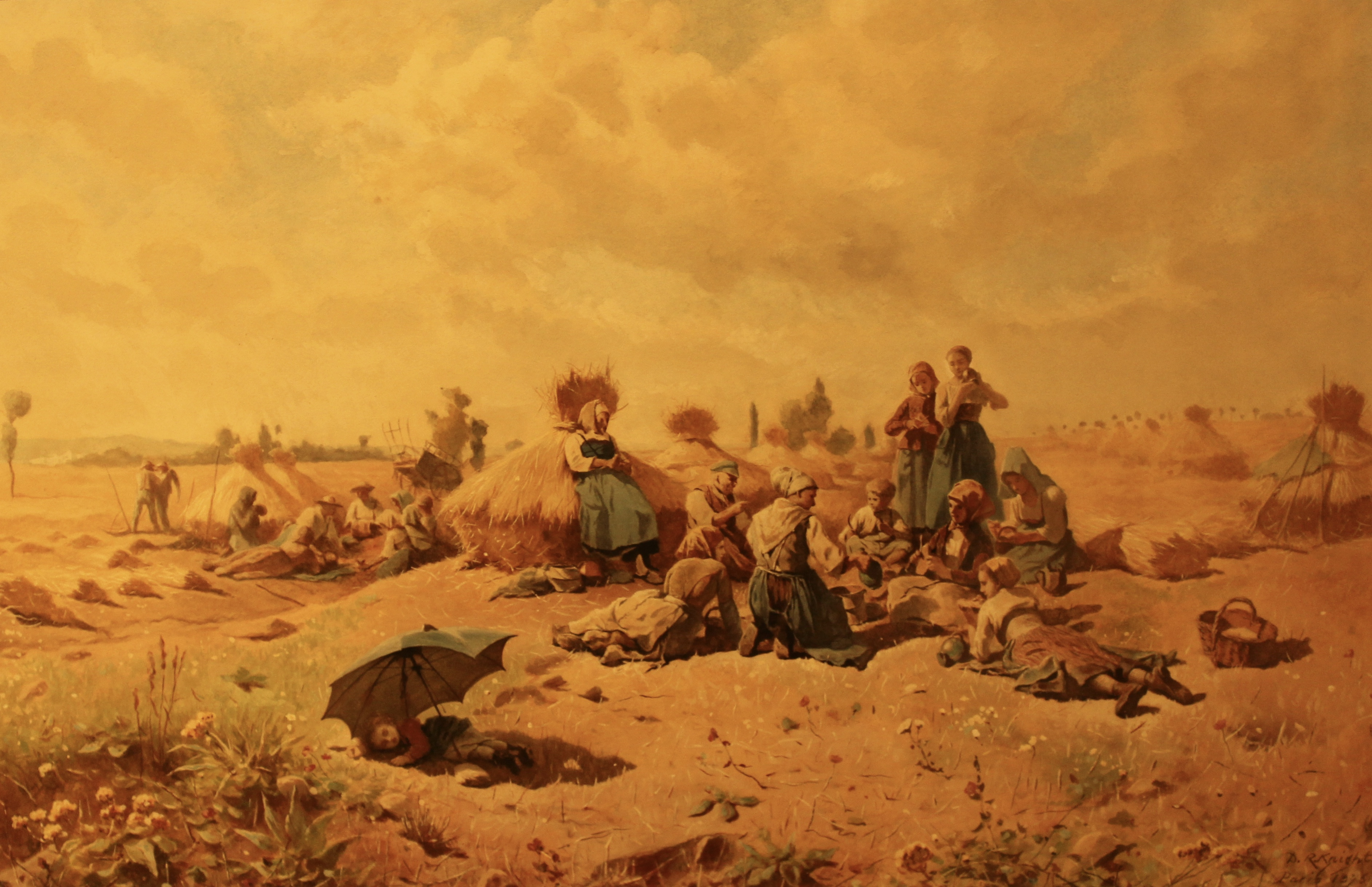
Pot a Feu by Daniel Ridgway Knight

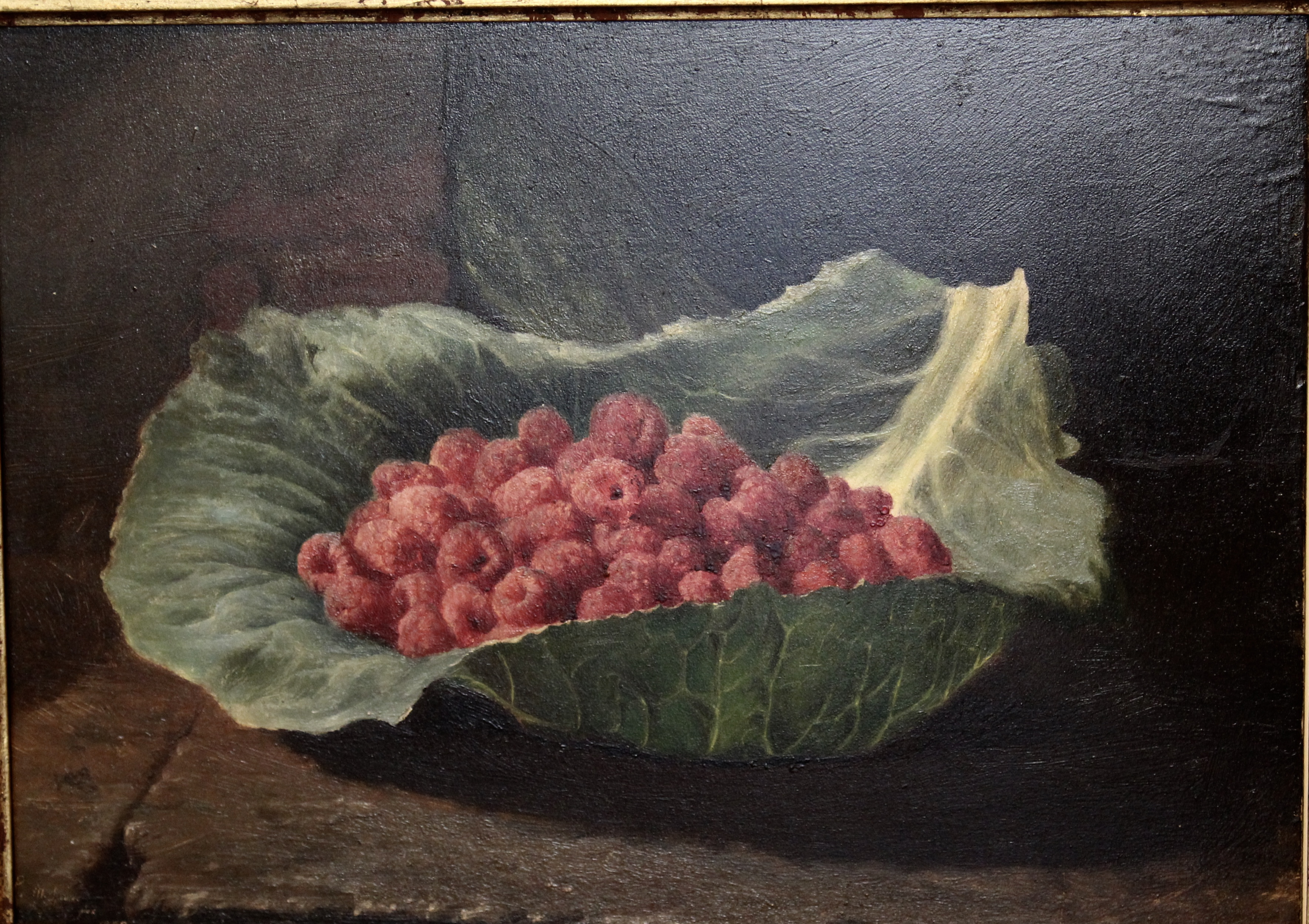
Raspberries on a Leaf (1858) by Lilly Martin Spencer

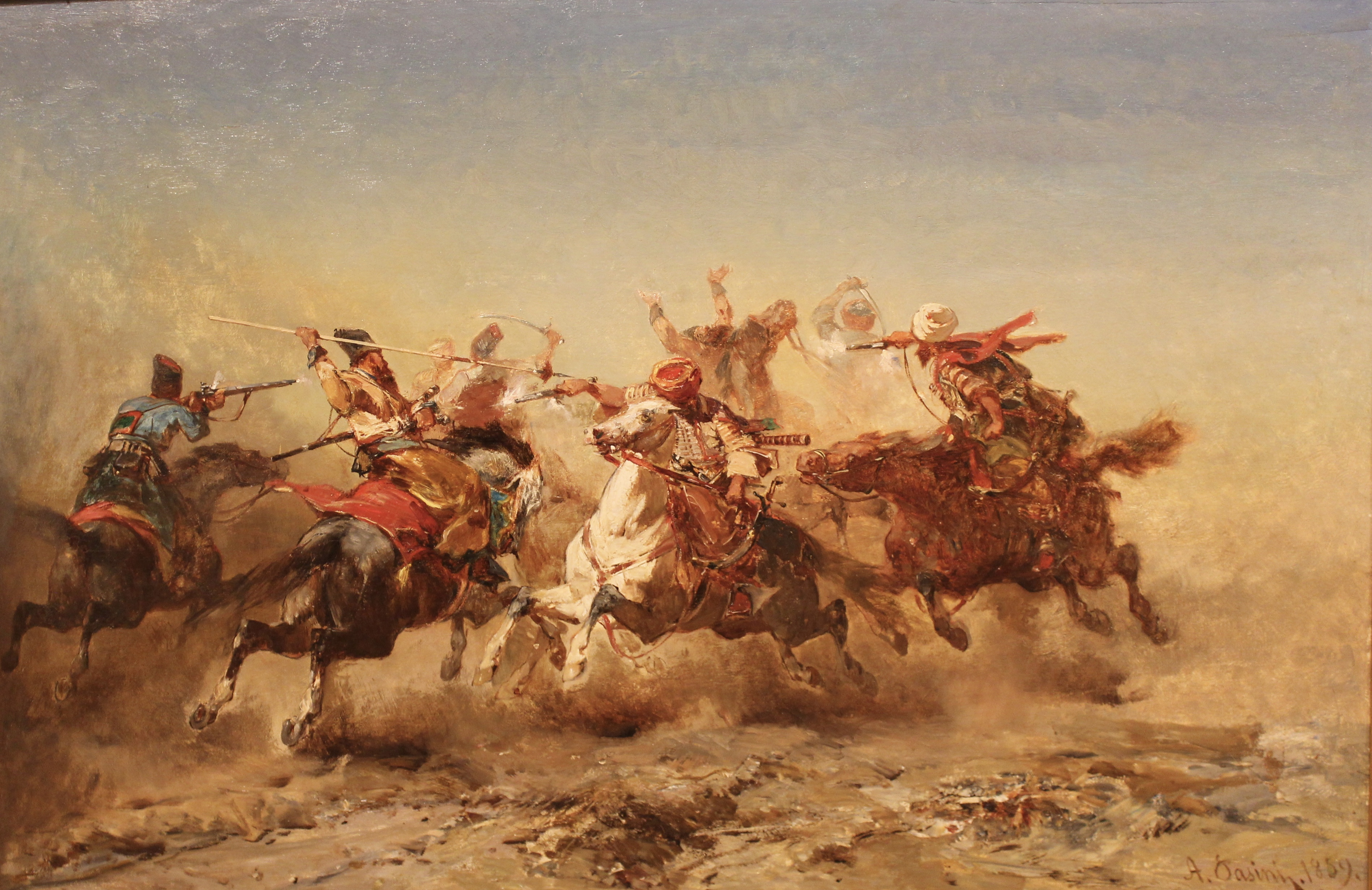
Spirited Conflict (1859) by Alberto Pasini

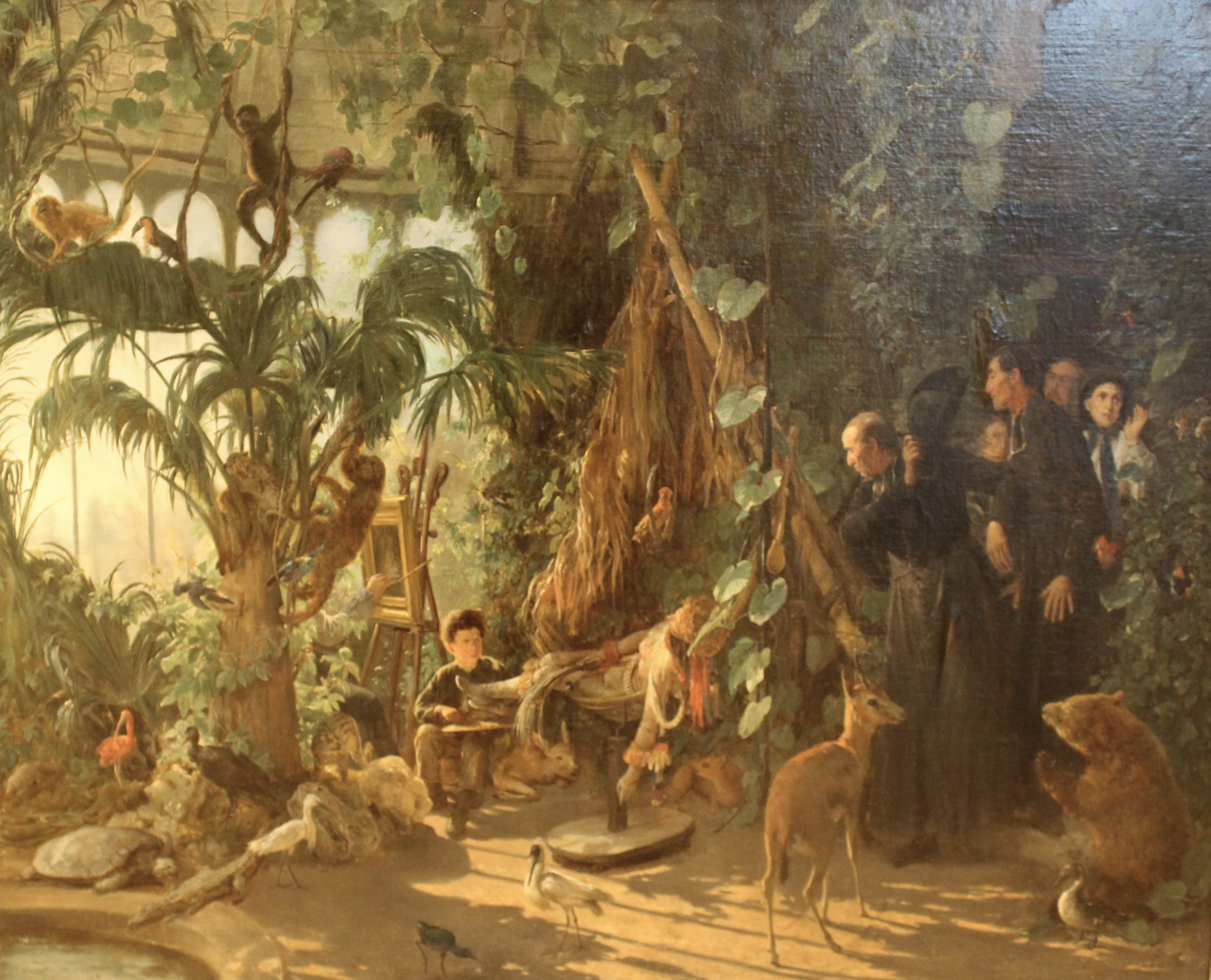
The Artists Den by François-Auguste Biard

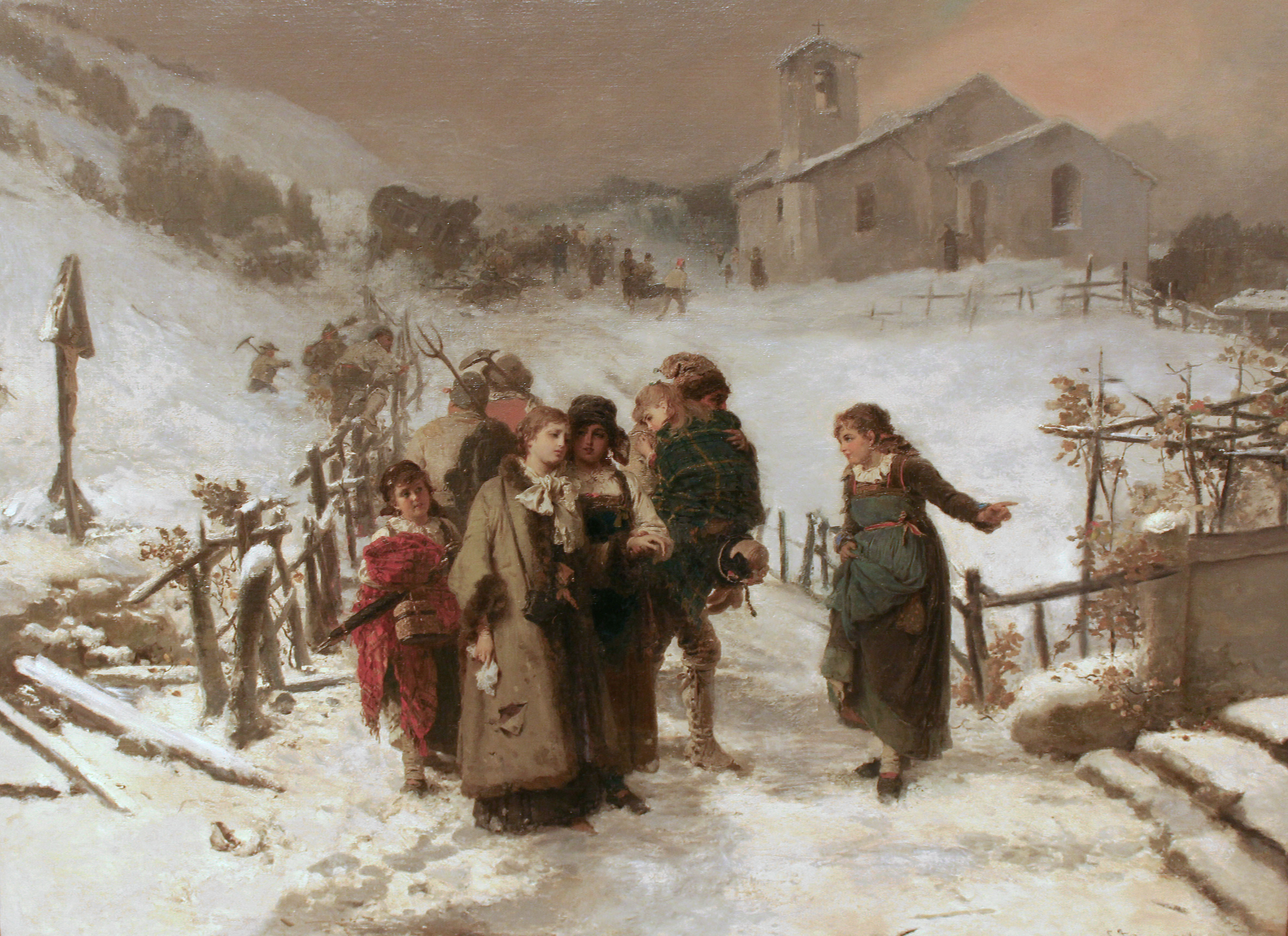
The Avalanche (1886) by Girolamo Induno

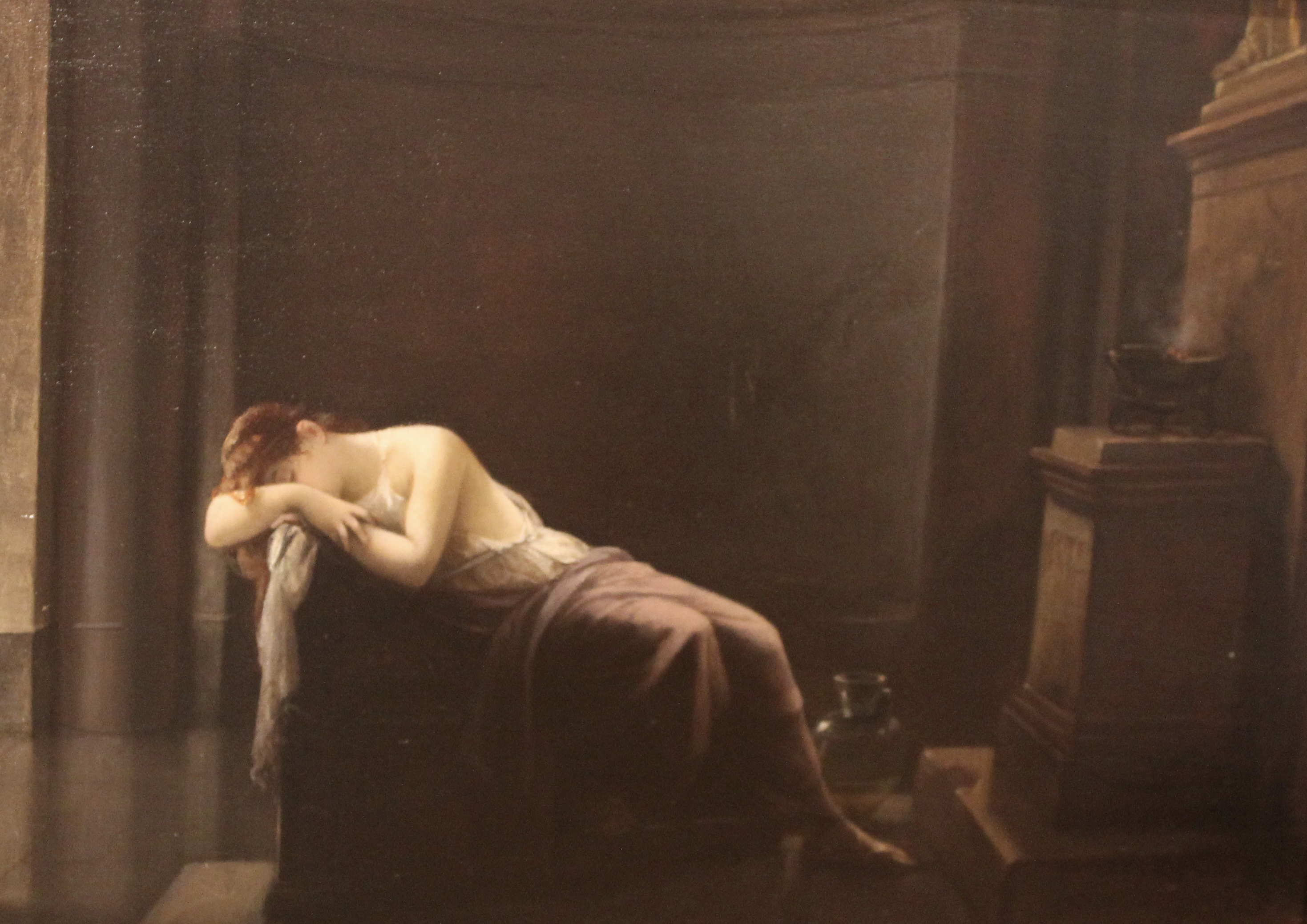
Une gardienne du feu sacre de vests by Louis Hector Leroux
