= Jonathan Edwards Woodbridge =

American shipbuilder (1844–1935)

- Born: January 16, 1844; Richmond, Virginia, U.S.
- Died: May 21, 1935 (aged 91)
- Resting place: Chester Rural Cemetery, Chester, Pennsylvania, U.S.
- Occupations: shipbuilder and ship designer

Jonathan Edwards Woodbridge (January 16, 1844 – May 21, 1935) was an American shipbuilder and naval architect from Richmond, Virginia. He served in the Confederate Army during the American Civil War and was one of the Virginia Military Institute cadets who fought at the Battle of New Market.

Woodbridge was the great-grandson of the preacher John Edwards and a prominent citizen of Chester, Pennsylvania. He was married to Louise Deshong, the daughter of the wealthy Chester businessman John O. Deshong.

== Early life, education, and military career ==
Woodbridge was born in Richmond, Virginia, to Reverend George and Rebecca (Nicolson) Woodbridge.

In 1861, Woodbridge entered the Virginia Military Institute (VMI) in Lexington, Virginia, following in the footsteps of his grandfather, a brigadier general in the Virginia Militia, and his father, Reverend George Woodbridge, who graduated from West Point.

In 1864, Woodbridge had risen to the rank of sergeant major, the highest-ranking noncommissioned officer in the corps.

In May 1864, Woodbridge was among the cadets who served in the Battle of New Market, commanded by General John C. Breckinridge to repel the advance of General Franz Sigel in the Shenandoah Valley.

After the battle of New Market, Woodbridge was promoted to Adjutant of the Corps of cadets.

In April 1865, Woodbridge was among a group of VMI cadets called to Richmond to man trenches left open by General Robert E. Lee's retreating forces.

In July 1865, Woodbridge returned to VMI and graduated 10th in his class.

== Shipbuilding career ==
After graduation, Woodbridge moved to Chester, Pennsylvania, where he worked in the drafting department of Reaney, Son & Archbold shipbuilding and continued in the department when it was purchased by the Delaware River Iron Shipbuilding and Engine Works owned by John Roach. Woodbridge eventually became the Superintending Engineer at the Roach shipyard.

In 1885, Woodbridge entered the U.S. government service and was employed at the Crane shipbuilding firm in Philadelphia, Pennsylvania, building ships for the Merchant Marines and U.S. Navy. He was employed for forty years as a naval architect and mechanical engineer.

== Manor House ==
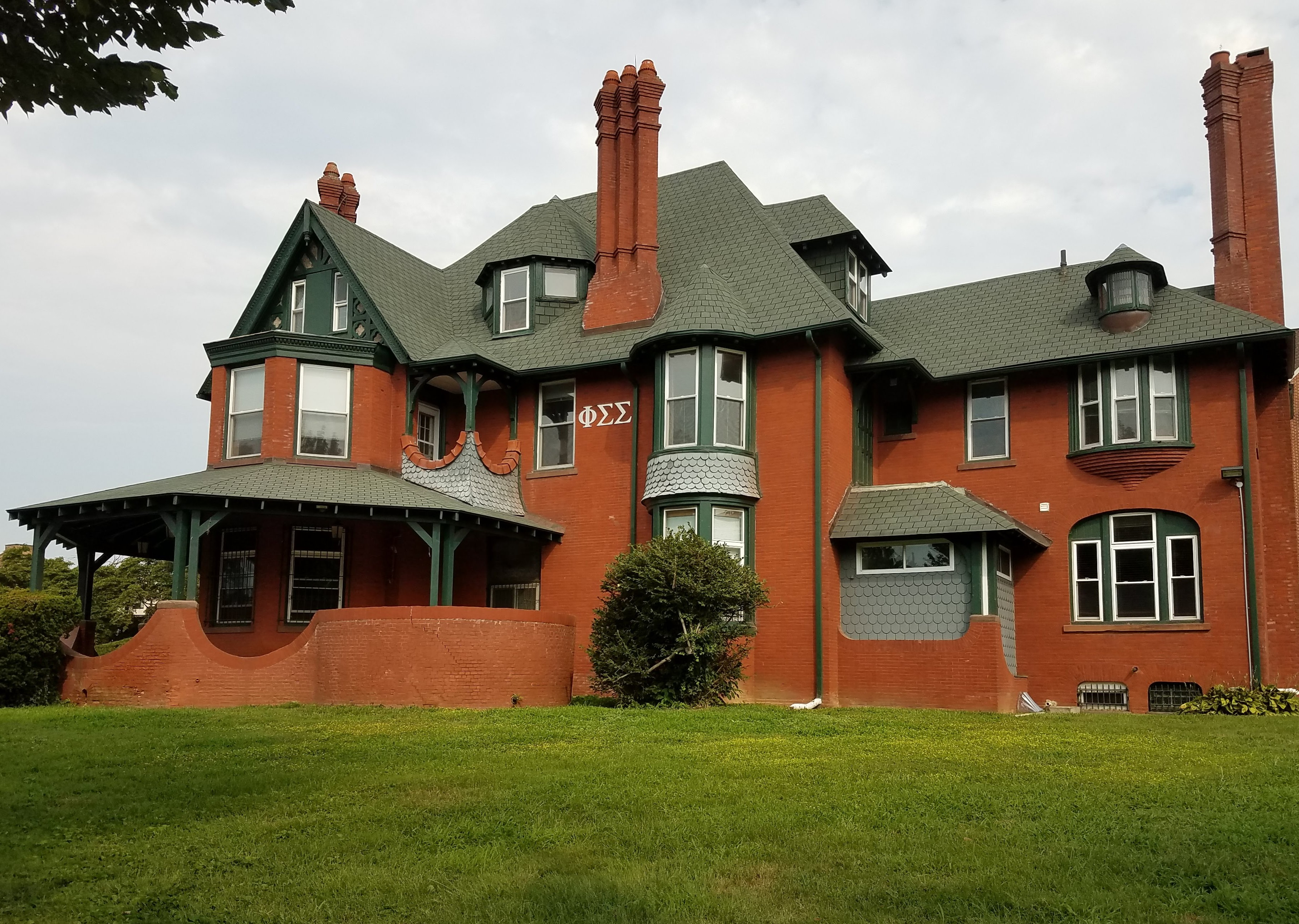
The Manor House on the campus of Widener University

The Manor House was designed and built by Woodbridge in 1888 at 14th and Potter Street in Chester, Pennsylvania. It was a wedding gift to his wife Louise Deshong and was originally named "The Louise". It was modeled after the late 19th-century English country manor style and is unique for its hand made brick construction.

The house was given to the city of Chester as a home for young women. In 1976, Widener University purchased the home for use as a student residence. It later became home to the Phi Sigma Sigma sorority. The home is currently used by Widener University as a student dormitory.

== Personal life ==
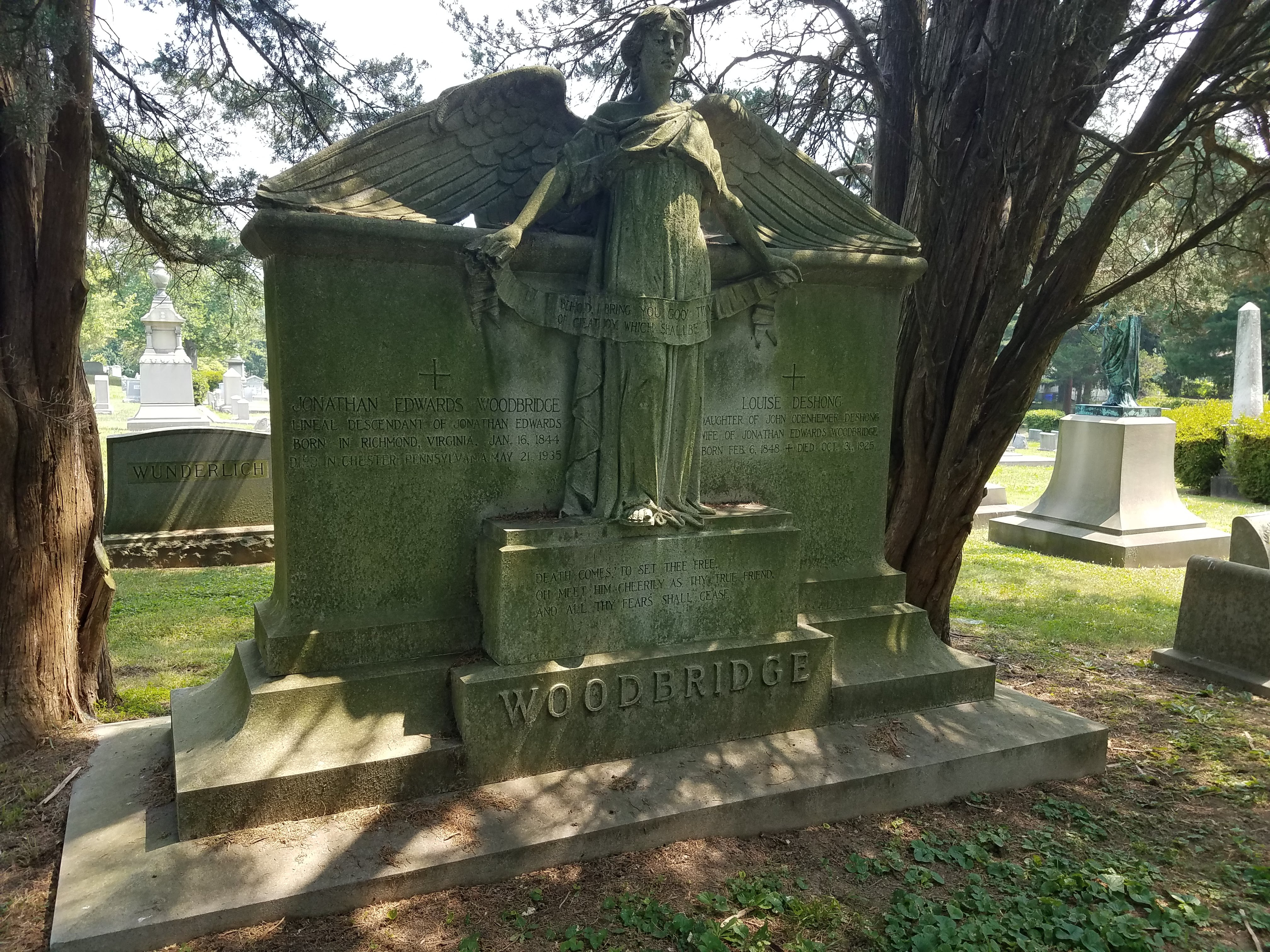
Jonathan Edwards Woodbridge grave at Chester Rural Cemetery in Chester, Pennsylvania

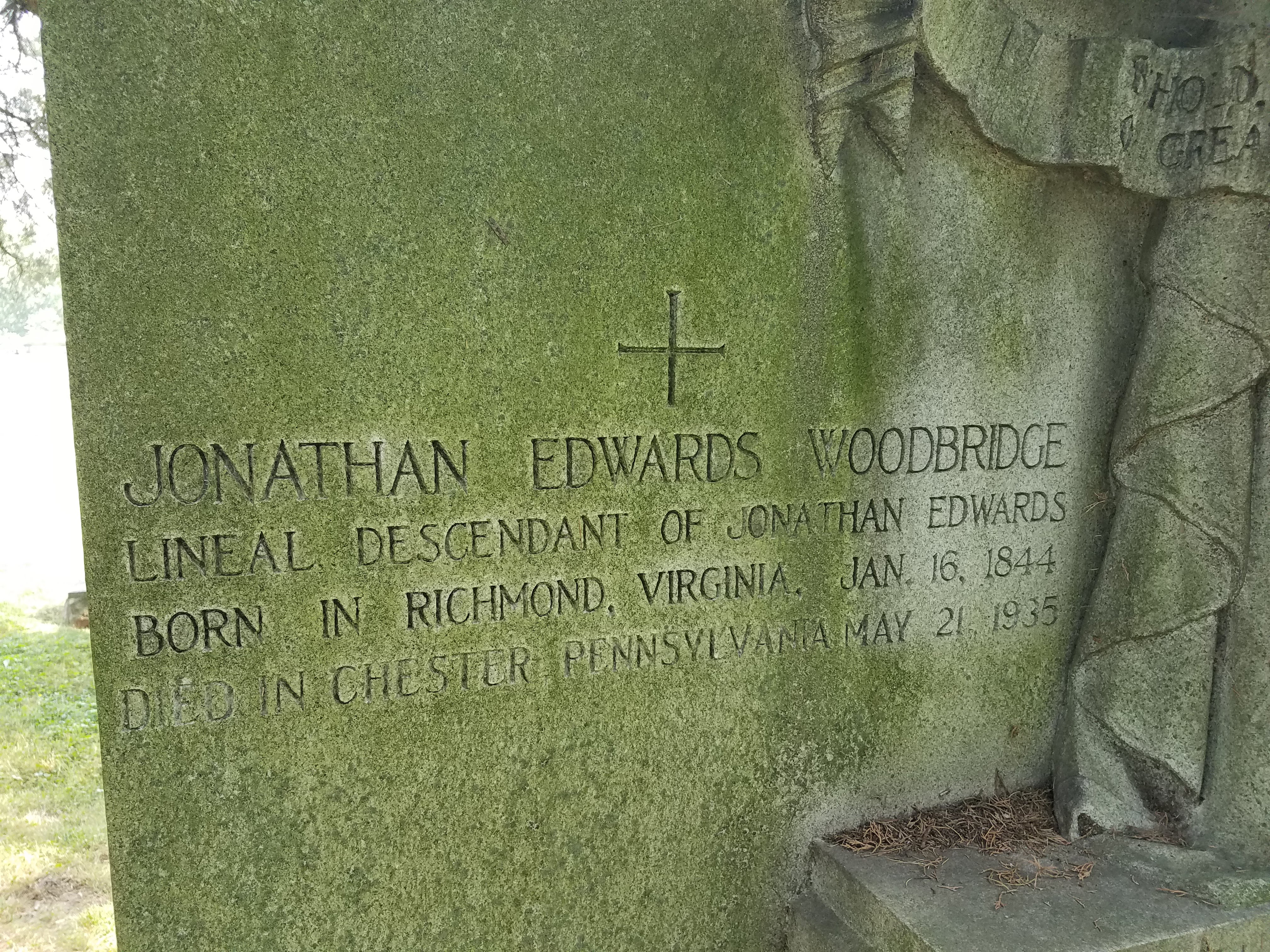
Close up of Jonathan Edwards Woodbridge grave

Woodbridge married Louise Deshong on May 23, 1876. Louise was the daughter of wealthy businessman and banker John O. Deshong. They were married for 49 years until her death in 1925.

Woodbridge is interred at the Chester Rural Cemetery in Chester, Pennsylvania.
