= Alfred O. Deshong =

American businessman, philanthropist and art collector (1837–1913)

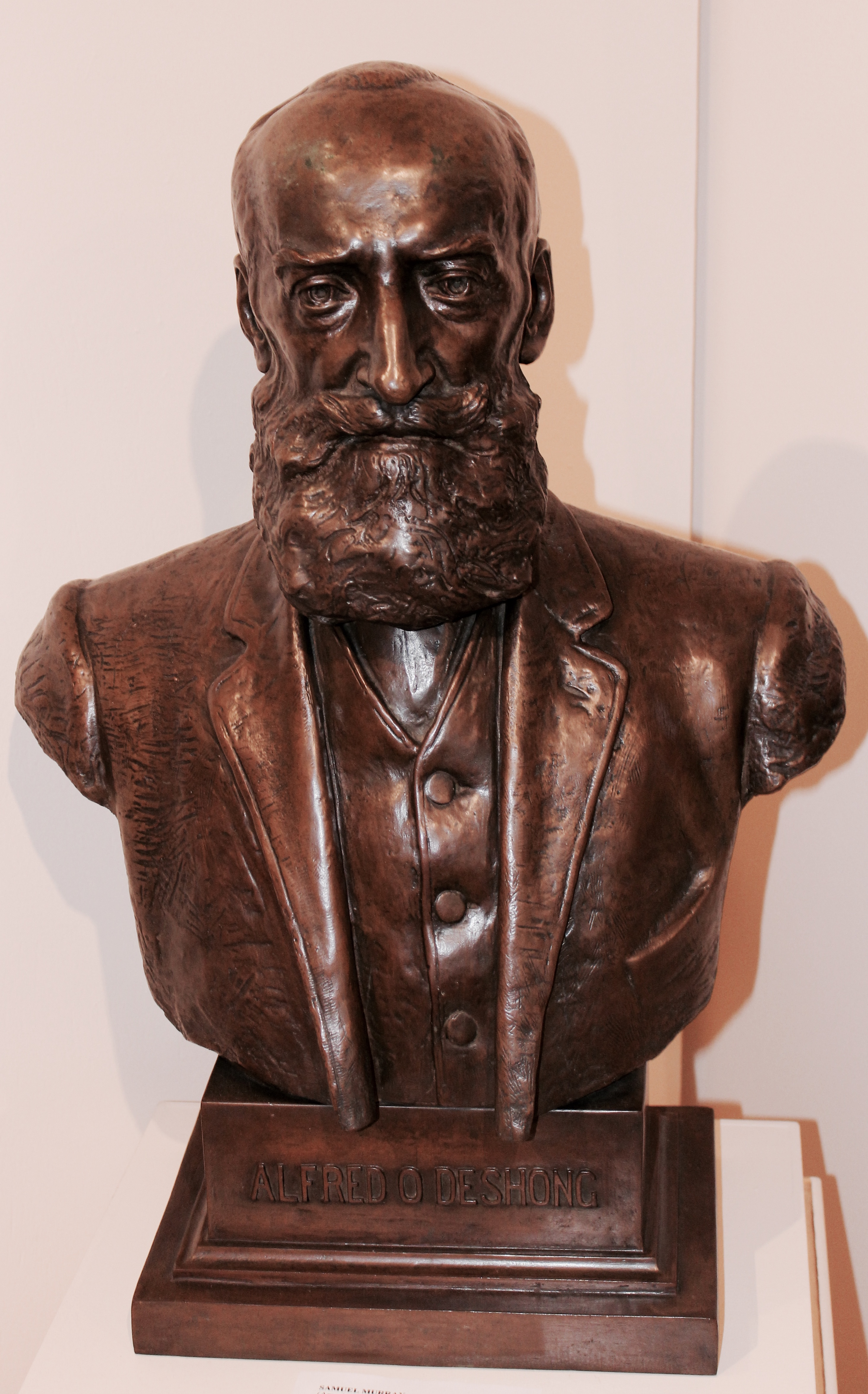
- Born: September 30, 1837; Chester, Pennsylvania, U.S.
- Died: April 19, 1913 (aged 75)
- Resting place: Chester Rural Cemetery, Chester, Pennsylvania, U.S.
- Occupations: Quarry owner, banker

Alfred Odenheimer Deshong (September 30, 1837 – April 19, 1913) was an American businessman, philanthropist and art collector from Chester, Pennsylvania. Deshong came from a wealthy family including his grandfather Peter Deshong and father John O. Deshong. He operated a successful quarry business with his brother and was a director of the Delaware County National Bank. He invested his fortune in the collection of art.

Deshong donated liberally to support the Chester Hospital and upon his death, donated his 22 acres (8.9 ha) property, mansion and art collection to the city of Chester which resulted in the creation of Deshong Park and the Deshong Art Museum. At current valuations, the donation would be worth over $24 million.

== Early life ==
Deshong was born on September 30, 1837, in Chester, Pennsylvania, to John O. Deshong and Emmeline L. (Terrill) Deshong. He was educated in the local schools and attended the Bolmar Academy in West Chester, Pennsylvania.

In 1862, Deshong enlisted as a private in Company K, Tenth Regiment of the Pennsylvania Militia and served in the Battle of Antietam under Captain Thatcher. He was honorably discharged on September 27, 1862.

In 1863, Deshong re-enlisted when Robert E. Lee invaded Pennsylvania. He enlisted in Company A of the 37th Regiment, Emergency Corps, known as the "Slipher Phalanx". He served in the Battle of Gettysburg and was honorably discharged on August 4, 1863.

== Career ==
In 1865, he entered into partnership with his brother, John O. Deshong, Jr., and operated the Deshong quarries in Ridley Township, Pennsylvania. The partnership was successful and lasted for 30 years until John's death on November 1, 1895.

In 1895, Deshong was elected a director of the Delaware County National Bank.

== Philanthropy ==
Deshong donated liberally to support Chester Hospital, located at 9th and Barclay Streets in Chester. The Alfred O. Deshong sanitary cottage for the treatment of tuberculosis was built by Deshong and donated to the Chester Hospital. After his death, he left in trust his art collection, mansion and 22-acre estate to the city of Chester. The value of the donation would be estimated at $24 million in current dollars. The bequest resulted in the establishment of the Deshong Park and the Deshong Art Museum.

=== Deshong Park ===
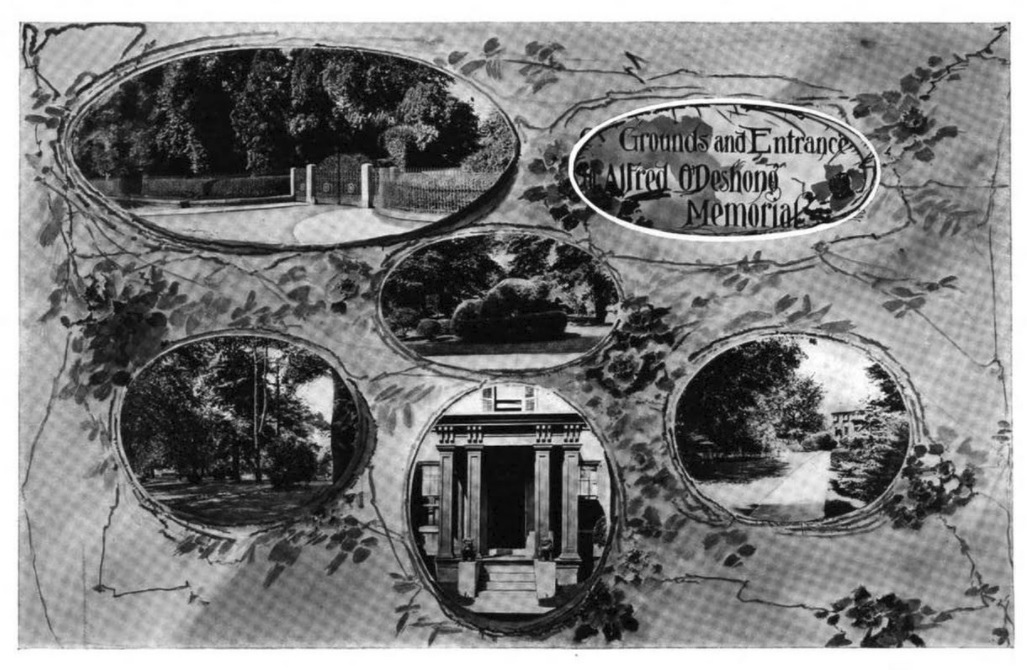
Grounds and Entrance of the Deshong Mansion

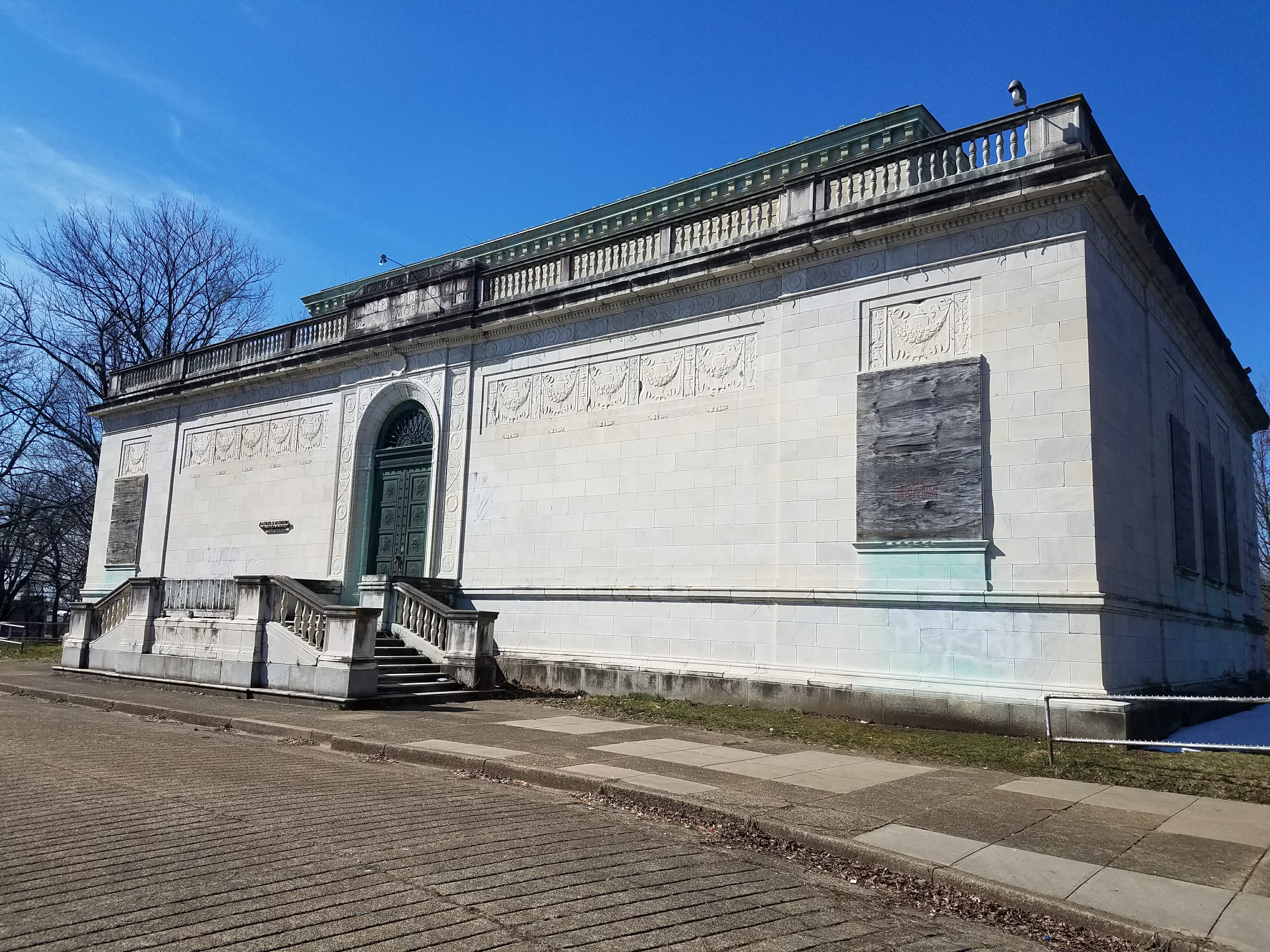
The defunct Deshong Art Museum in 2018

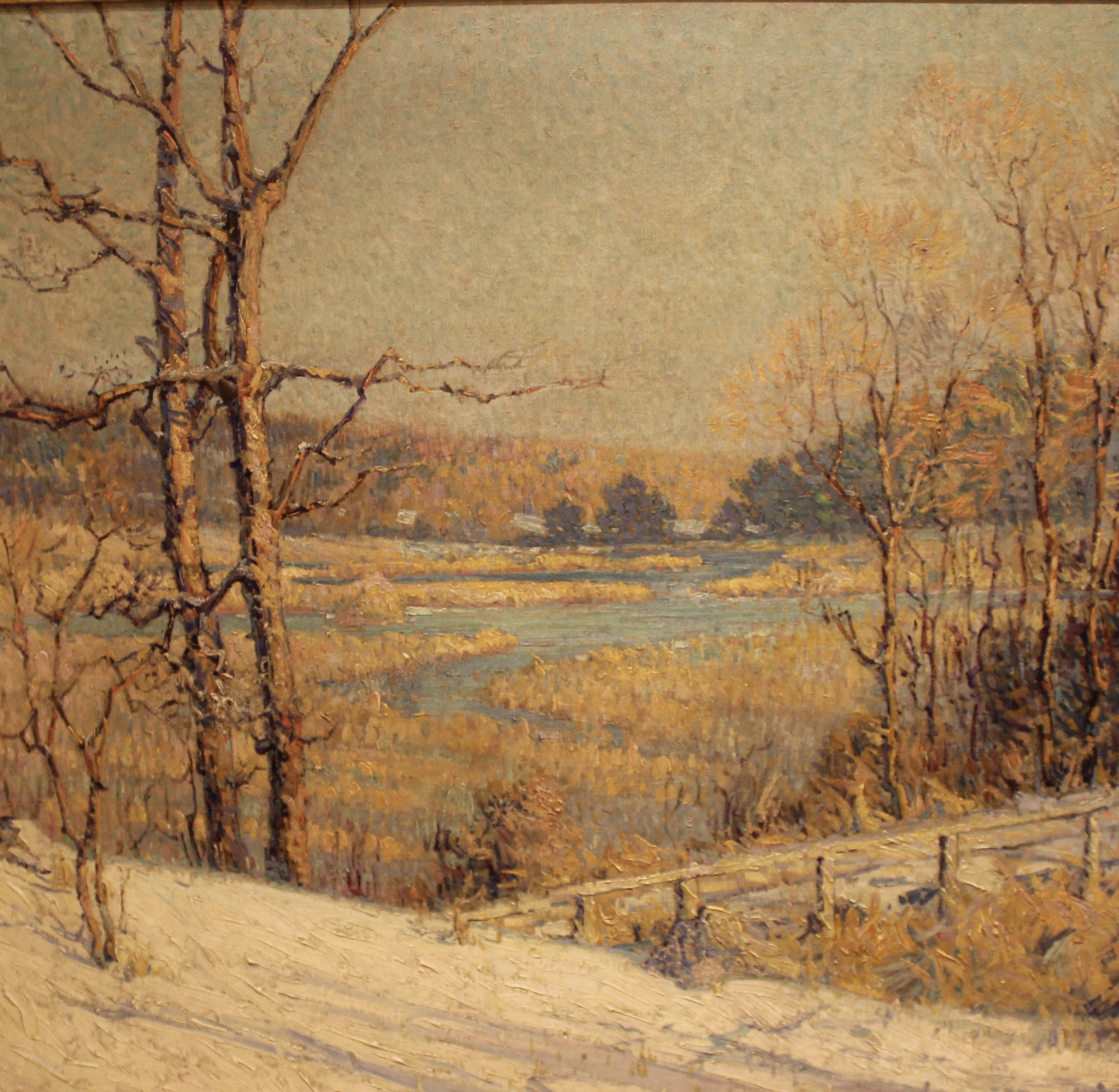
Meadows in Winter painting by George Loftus Noyes from the Widener University Art Museum Alfred O. Deshong Collection

The Deshong mansion was built in 1850 on 22 acres (8.9 ha) off Edgemont Avenue in the Greek Revival Italianate style by Alfred's father, John O. Deshong, Sr. It was willed to the people of Chester after Alfred's death. The land was turned into a public park named Deshong Park and an art museum was built on the property. The mansion and art museum fell into disrepair in the 1980s. The trust was dissolved and the property was taken over by the Delaware County Industrial Development Authority. The mansion suffered a partial collapse in 2013 and was demolished in 2014. In 2018, 60% of the park was sold for commercial development.

=== Deshong Memorial Art Gallery ===
The Deshong Memorial Art Gallery was built in 1914 after his death on the same property as the Deshong Mansion. The building was designed to be fireproof with exterior walls of Dover marble. The large main gallery for paintings was modeled after the Emperor of Germany's gallery at Cassel. It housed over 300 pieces of art including carved Japanese ivory figures, Chinese carved hard stone vessels and 19th century American and European paintings including American Impressionists Edward Redfield, Robert Spencer and George Loftus Noyes

Deshong's last art purchase was a pair of large Foo dogs cast in bronze. The statues were placed flanking the doors of the Deshong mansion.

At one time it was the only public art gallery on the East Coast. From 1961 to 1978 the building was operated as a library, but over the years, it fell into disrepair.

Between 1976 and 1979, teenager Laurence McCall from Chester, Pennsylvania, stole paintings from the art gallery. The museum had limited security and McCall was able to steal paintings valued at the time at $300,000, by simply taking them off the wall and sliding them out of the museum's windows. Many of the stolen items were sold through Sotheby's in New York City. McCall was eventually caught, sentenced to fifteen years in prison, and served three. A majority of the artwork was recovered.

In 1979, Widener University leased the building and restored the museum. In July 1984, the remaining trustees who managed the art museum dissolved the trust. The Asian and impressionistic art collection and $500,000 of the trust were given to Widener University, where the collection is currently displayed.

== Personal life ==
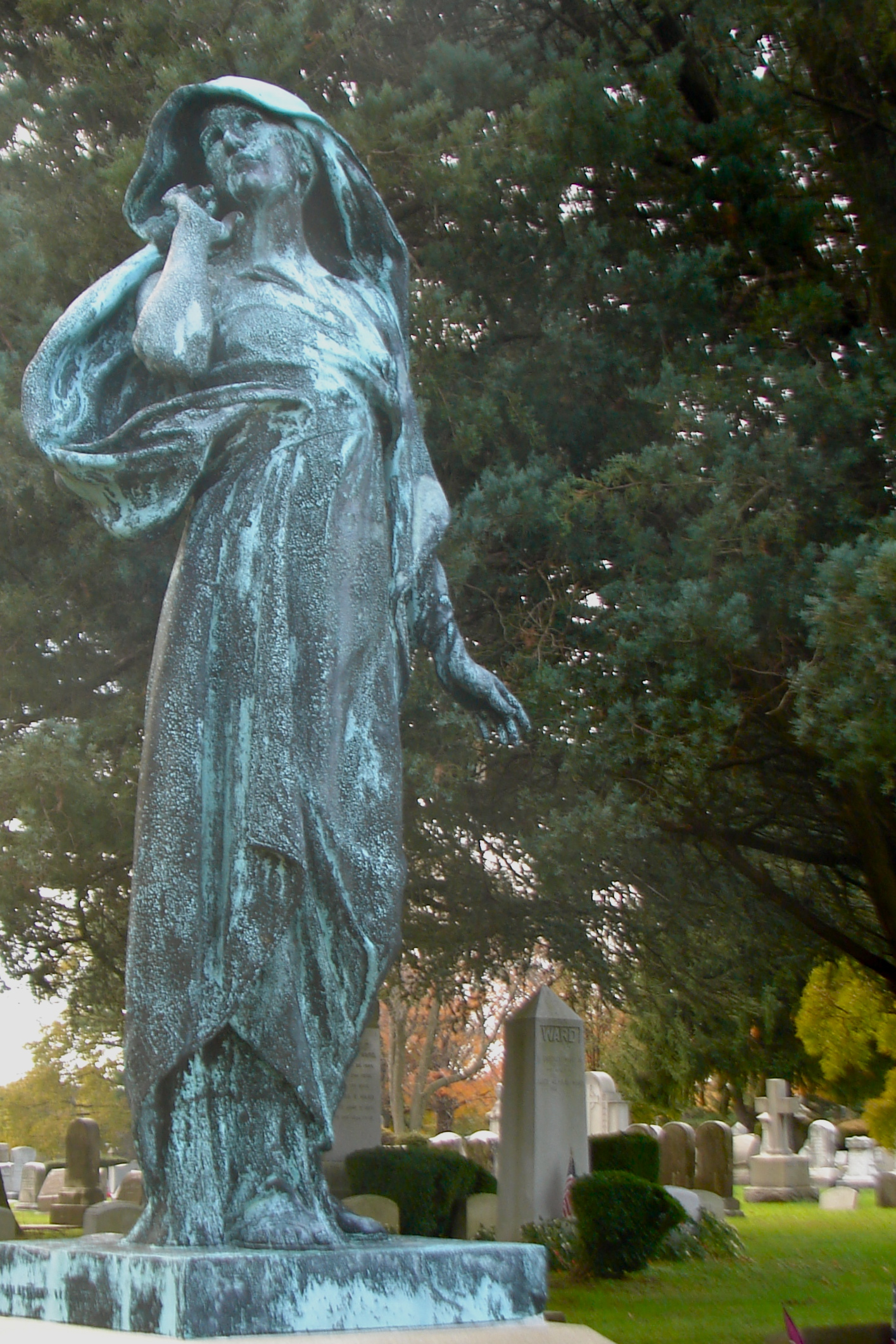
The sculpture "Sorrow" by Samuel Murray sits atop Deshong's grave at Chester Rural Cemetery

Deshong was known as a lavish host and entertained artists, musicians and political figures at the Deshong mansion. He never married and became reclusive toward the end of his life.

He died on April 19, 1913, and was interred at Chester Rural Cemetery. His grave is marked by the bronze sculpture, "Sorrow" by Samuel Murray. It was commissioned by Deshong and installed the year before his death.
