= Peter Deshong =

American businessman and banker

Peter Deshsong
- Born: 1781; Philadelphia, Pennsylvania, U.S.
- Died: December 26, 1827 (aged 45–46)
- Resting place: Chester Rural Cemetery, Chester, Pennsylvania, U.S.
- Occupation(s): Grist mill owner, banker

Peter Deshong (1781 – December 26, 1827) was an American businessman and banker in Chester, Pennsylvania. His family maintained their wealthy status through generations including his son John O. Deshong and grandson Alfred O. Deshong.

== Early life ==
Deshong was born in Philadelphia, Pennsylvania, to French immigrants Peter and Susanna (Gilman) DeShaw. The family name was anglicized to Deshong. As a young man, he relocated to Chester, Pennsylvania and began his career.

== Career ==
Deshong was the owner of the Lapidea Grist Mill on Crum Creek in Ridley, Pennsylvania, from 1803 to 1808.

Deshong was one of the organizers of the Delaware County National Bank, one of its first directors, the first notary of the bank and a board member until his death.

In the 1820s, Deshong owned the sloop "Mary and Louisa" which sailed the Delaware River twice weekly carrying cargo between Chester and Philadelphia.

== Personal life ==
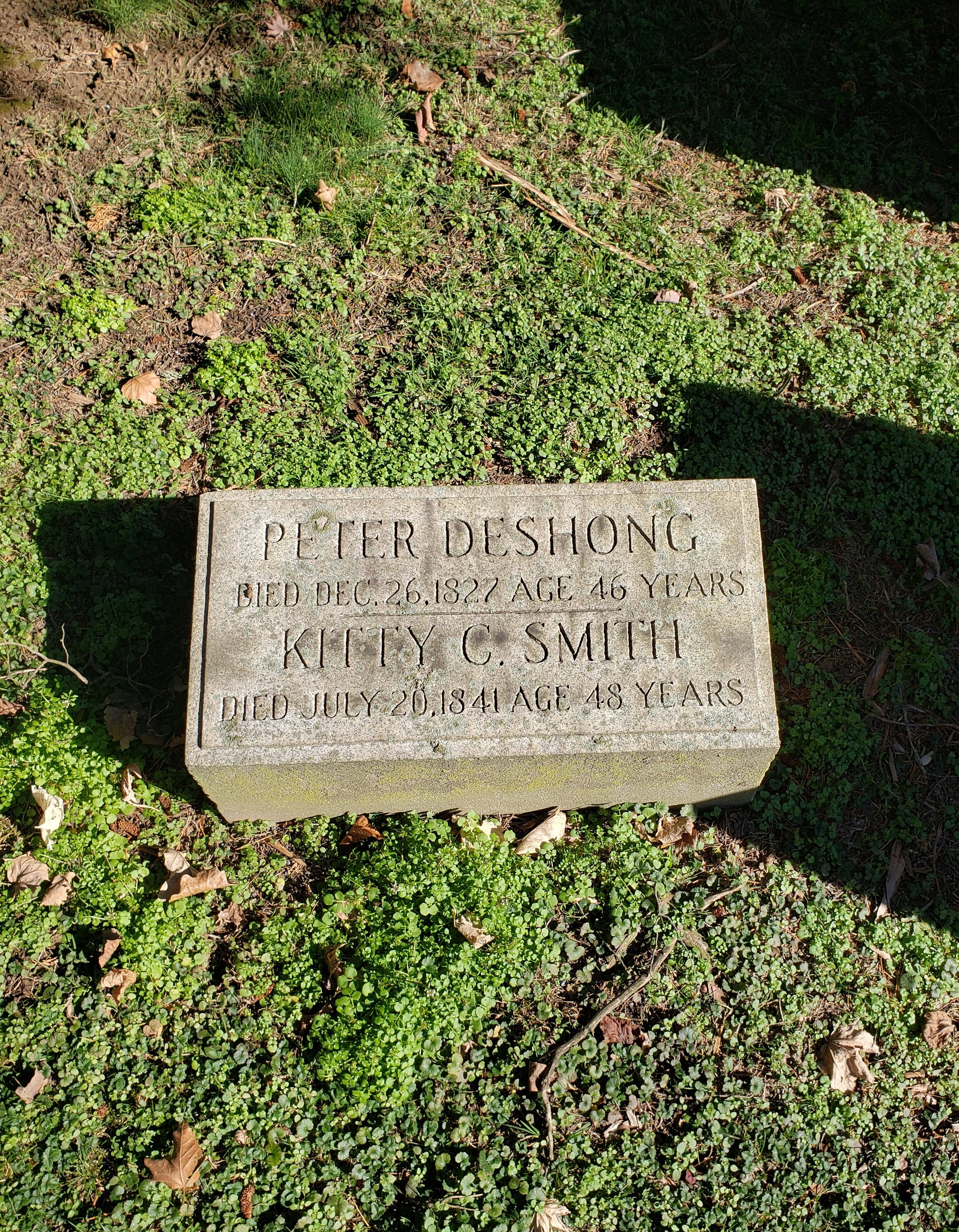
Peter Deshong gravestone in Chester Rural Cemetery

Deshong married Mary Odenheimer. Their son John O. Deshong was a wealthy businessman and banker in Chester. Their grandson Alfred O. Deshong was an industrialist, philanthropist and art collector.

Peter Deshong was one of the incorporators of the St. Paul's Episcopal Church in Chester, Pennsylvania in 1818 and served as a vestryman for 20 years.

He died on December 26, 1827, and is interred at Chester Rural Cemetery in Chester, Pennsylvania.
