= John O. Deshong =

American businessman and banker

John O. Deshsong
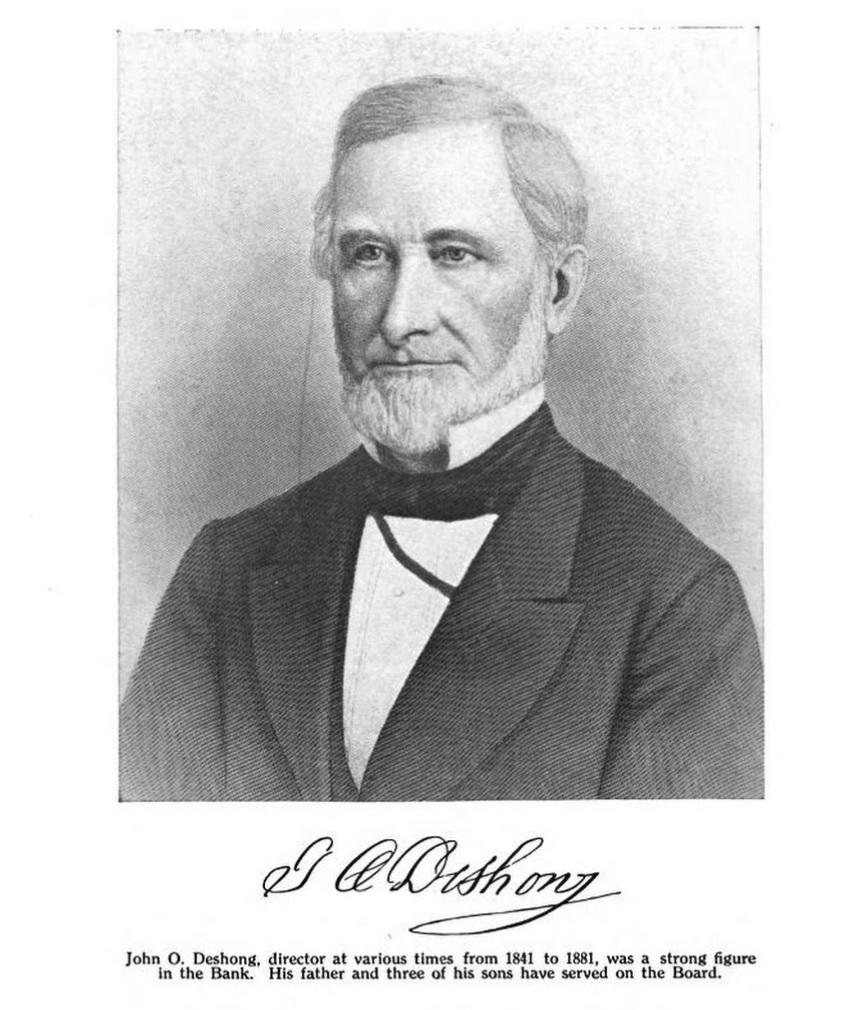
- Born: September 6, 1807; Chester, Pennsylvania, U.S.
- Died: May 28, 1881 (aged 73)
- Resting place: Chester Rural Cemetery, Chester, Pennsylvania, U.S.
- Occupation(s): lumber and banker

John Odenheimer Deshong (September 6, 1807 – May 28, 1881) was an American businessman and banker in Chester, Pennsylvania. He came from a wealthy family including his father Peter Deshong and son Alfred O. Deshong.

== Early life ==
Deshong was born in Chester, Pennsylvania to Peter Deshong and Mary Odenheimer Deshong. He was the eldest of three children and was educated in a private school in the borough.

== Career ==
As a young adult, Deshong established a general store at Fourth and Market Street. In 1842, he withdrew from general merchandising and entered the lumber business. His success in the lumber business allowed him to retire from active business in 1849. Deshong turned his attention to financial affairs, using his capital as a dealer in commercial paper.

Deshong inherited the Odenheimer quarry in Ridley township and also owned a quarry on Crum Creek known as "Island Field".

Deshong was a director in the Delaware County National Bank at various times from 1841 to 1881.

Deshong was a director of the Chester Gas Company and one of the largest owner of its stock.

== Deshong Mansion ==
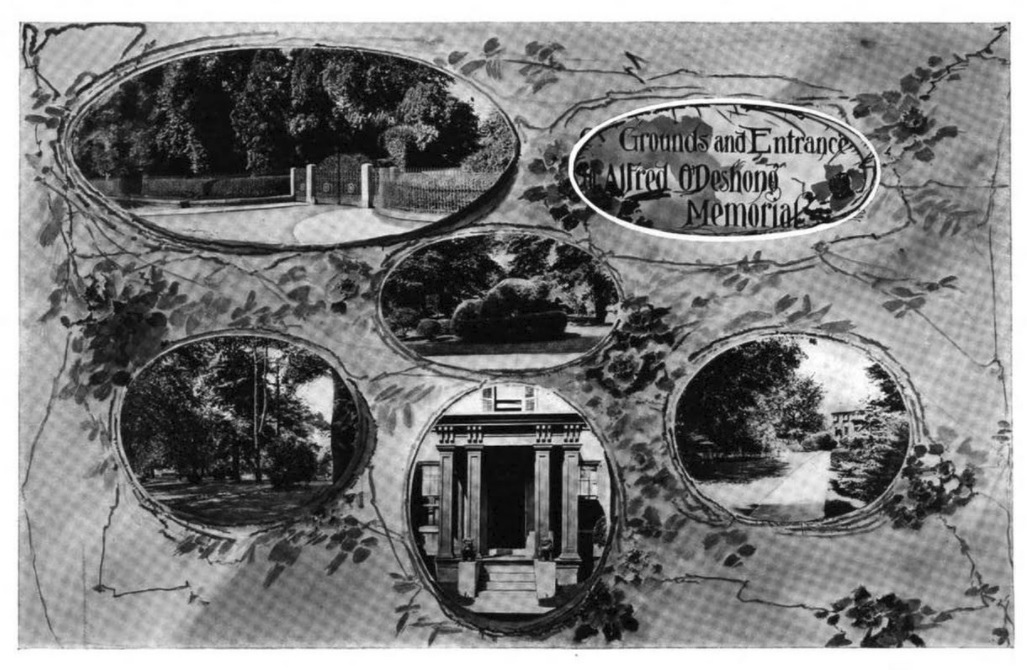
Grounds and Entrance of the Deshong Mansion

The Deshong mansion was built in 1850 on 22 acres off Edgemont Avenue in the Greek Revival Italianate style . It was willed to the people of Chester after his son Alfred O. Deshong's death. The land was turned into a public park named Deshong Park and an art museum was built on the property, however, the mansion and art museum fell into disrepair in the 1980s. The trust was dissolved and the property was taken over by the Delaware County Industrial Development Authority. The mansion suffered a partial collapse in 2013 and was demolished in 2014.

== Personal life ==
On Dec. 6,1826, Deshong married Emmeline L. Terrill and together they had seven children. Their son Alfred O. Deshong became a noted industrialist, philanthropist and art collector. Their daughter, Louise was a pioneer in photography by women and married the shipbuilder and naval architect Jonathan Edwards Woodbridge.

He died on May 28, 1881, and is interred at Chester Rural Cemetery in Chester, Pennsylvania.

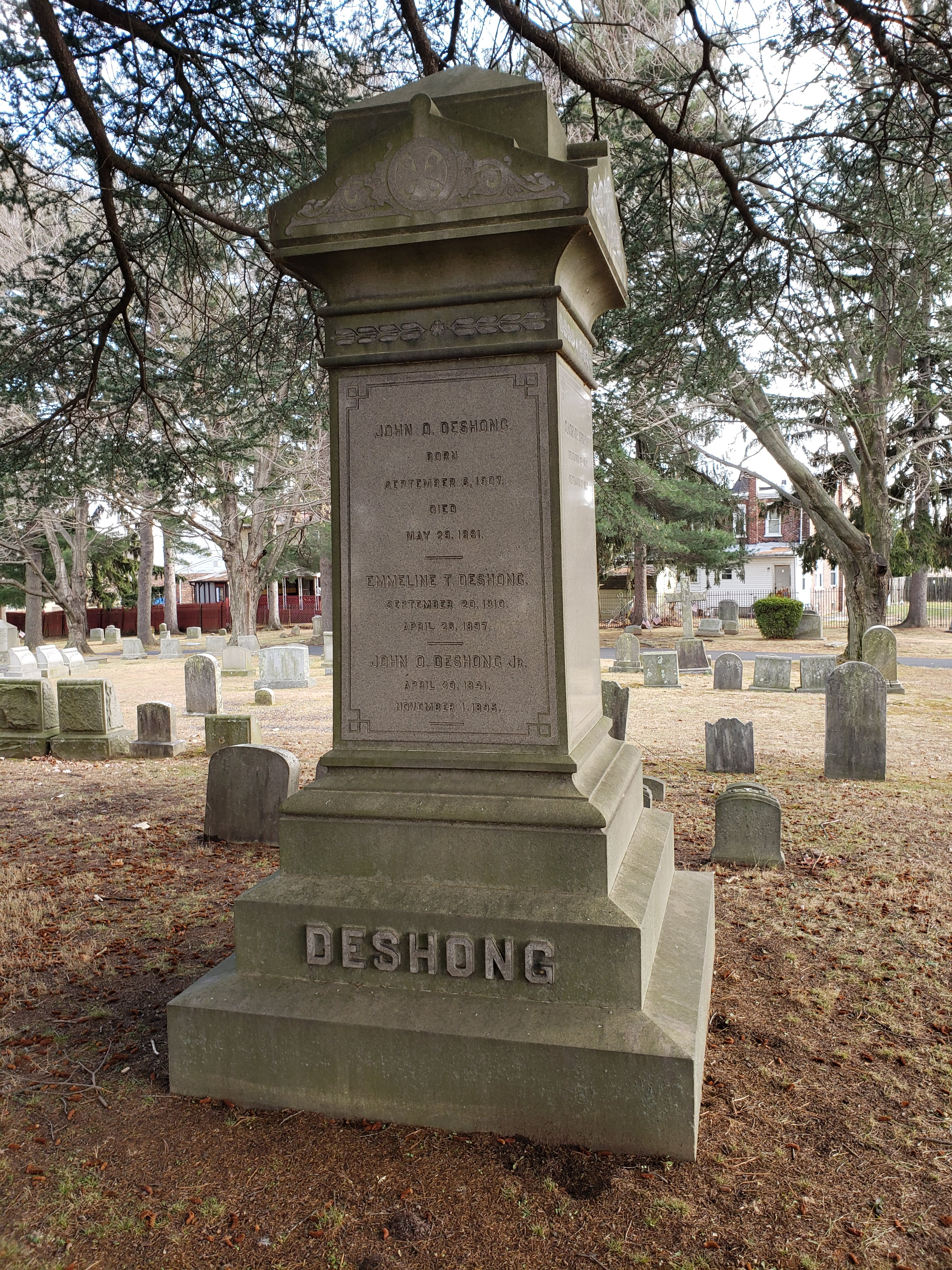
John Deshong grave
