= Delaware County National Bank =

- Delaware County National Bank Building
- U.S. National Register of Historic Places
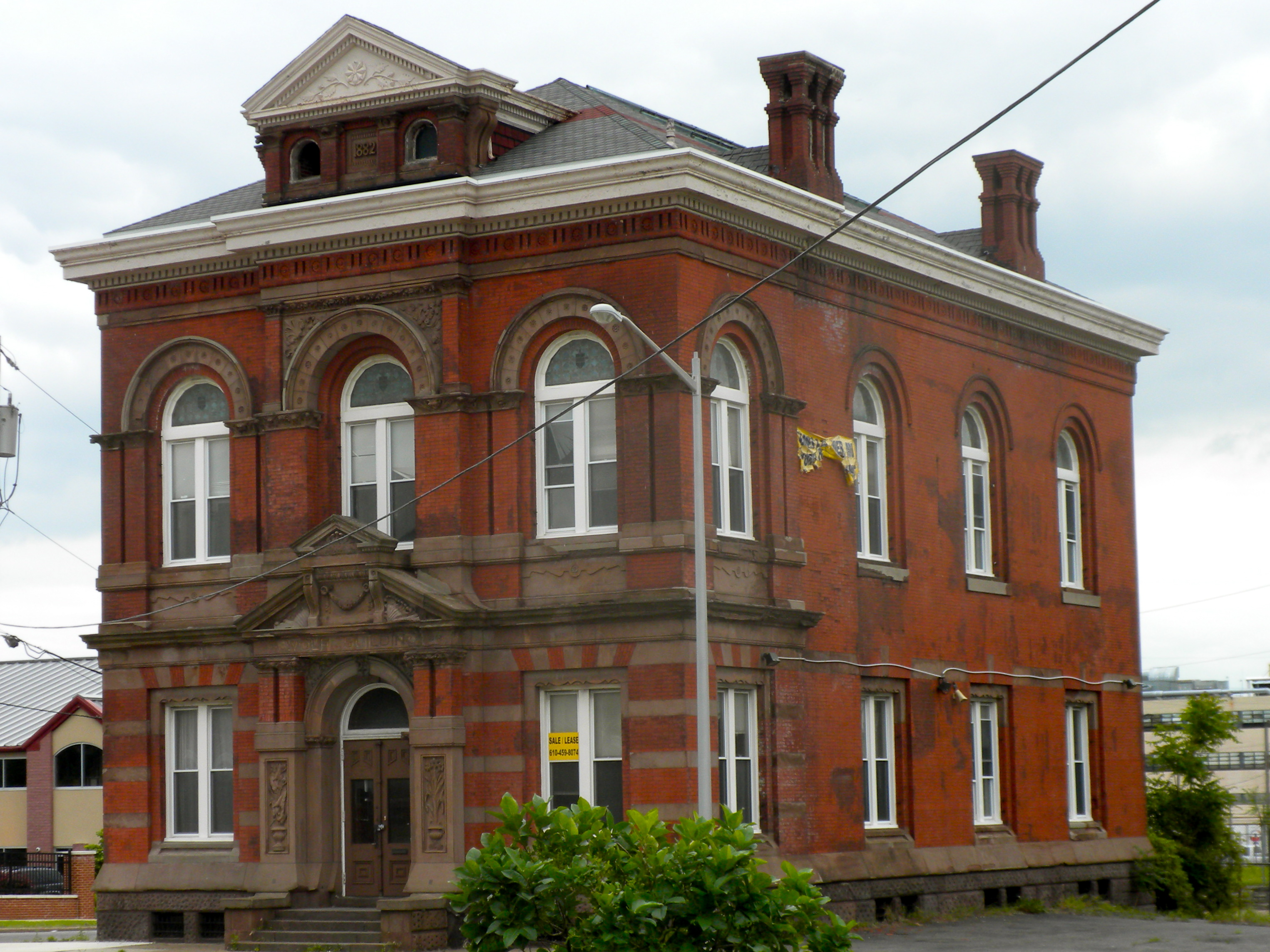
- Delaware County National Bank building, May 2010

- Location within Pennsylvania Location within the United States
- Location: 5 W. Third St., Chester, Pennsylvania
- Coordinates: 39°50′49″N 75°21′34″W
- Area: 0.1 acres (0.040 ha)
- Built: 1882-1884
- Architect: Welsh, Patrick A.
- Architectural style: Renaissance
- NRHP reference No.: 87001947
- Added to NRHP: November 5, 1987

Delaware County National Bank is a historic bank building in Chester, Pennsylvania, located at the southwest corner of 3rd Street and Avenue of the States (formerly Market Square) adjacent to the Old St. Paul's Church burial ground. It was built between 1882 and 1884, and is a 2 1/2-story masonry building in the Renaissance Revival style. It is built of brick and brownstone and has a low hipped slate-covered roof. The roof features metal cresting, five projecting decorated chimneys, and four Corinthian order pilasters supporting the front pediment dormer. It was headquarters for the Delaware County National Bank from 1884 to 1930.

It was listed on the National Register of Historic Places in 1987.

== History ==
During the construction of the current building in 1882, the Bank transacted business in the old kitchen annex of the cashier's home.

Delaware County National Bank was chartered by the Pennsylvania state government in 1814 and was Delaware County's first bank. In 1864, the bank was incorporated as a national bank. In 1882, the Board of Directors determined that the bank had outgrown the original 1814 building and hired Patrick A. Welsh to design a new building. The building was razed and the current Delaware County National Bank was built on the same site.

In 1930, the building stopped serving as the offices of the Delaware County National Bank. Since then it has served as offices for the Crozer-Chester Medical Center, the United Way and the RDC Institute.

== Notable people affiliated with Delaware County National Bank ==
- John Price Crozer - Wealthy textile manufacturer who was a director from 1825 to 1862. His son, Samuel A. Crozer, was president of the bank from 1864 to 1865.
- Edward Darlington - US Congressman from Pennsylvania was a director at the Delaware County National Bank.
- Alfred O. Deshong - Industrialist and art collector. Elected director of the bank in 1895.
- John O. Deshong - A wealthy businessman was a director of the bank from 1845 until his death in 1881.
- Peter Deshong - One of the organizers of the bank and was elected director March 10, 1815. Deshong held the position of director for 10 years. He was the first notary of the bank and served on the board until his death in 1827.
- Samuel Edwards - U.S. Congressman from Pennsylvania was a director at the bank.
- David Reese Esrey - Co-owner of the Powhattan Mills, manufacturers of cotton goods, was a director of the bank from 1878 until his death in 1898.
- David Trainer - The textile manufacturer and owner of the Linwood Mills, was a director of the bank and the third president from 1874-1875.

== Images ==
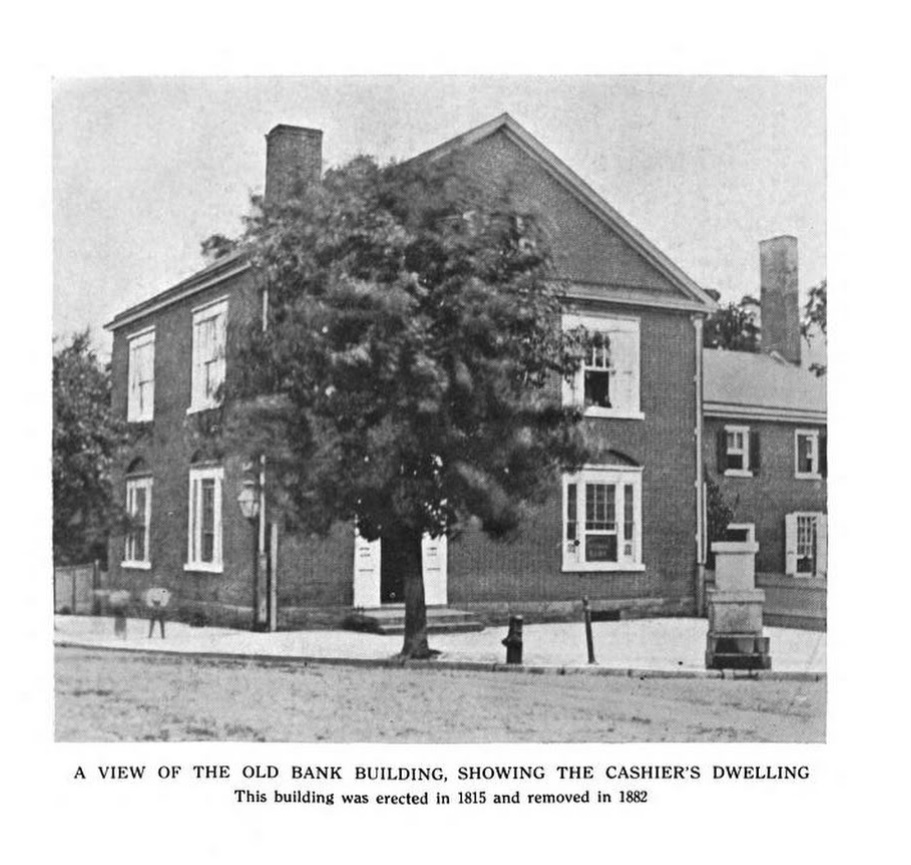
The old Delaware County National Bank built in 1815 and demolished in 1882

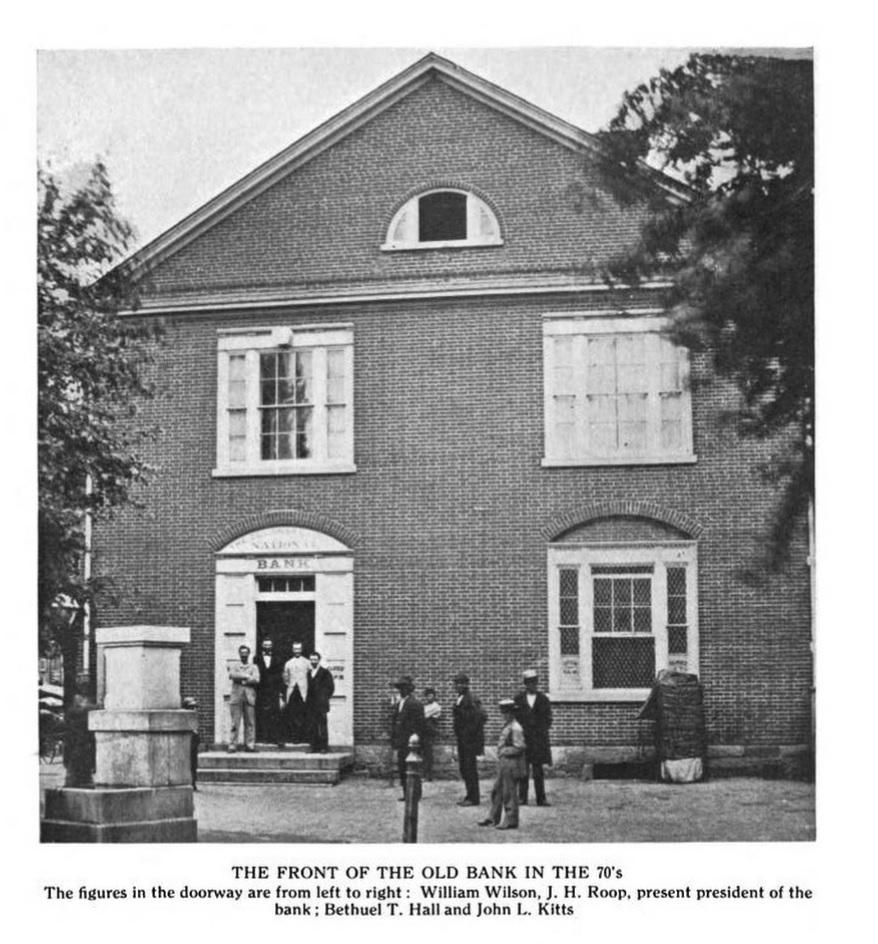
Front of the old Delaware County National Bank in the 1870s

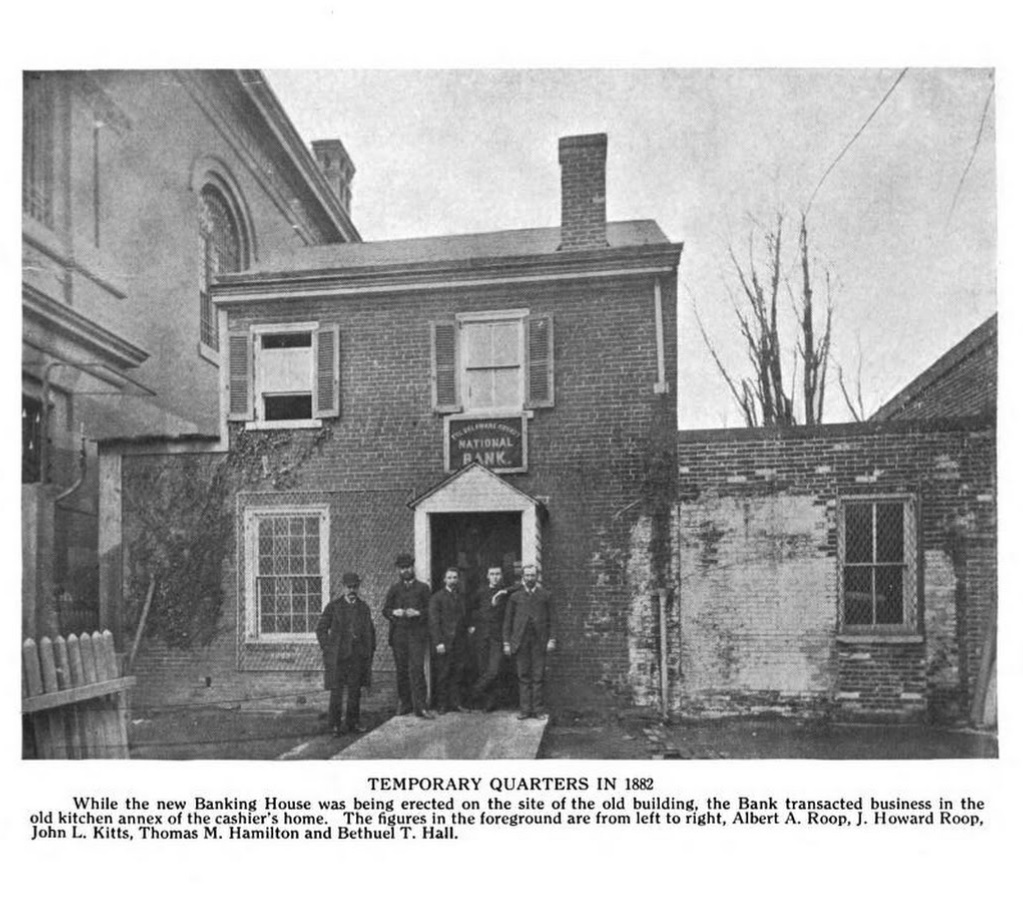
Temporary quarters of the Delaware County National Bank in 1882

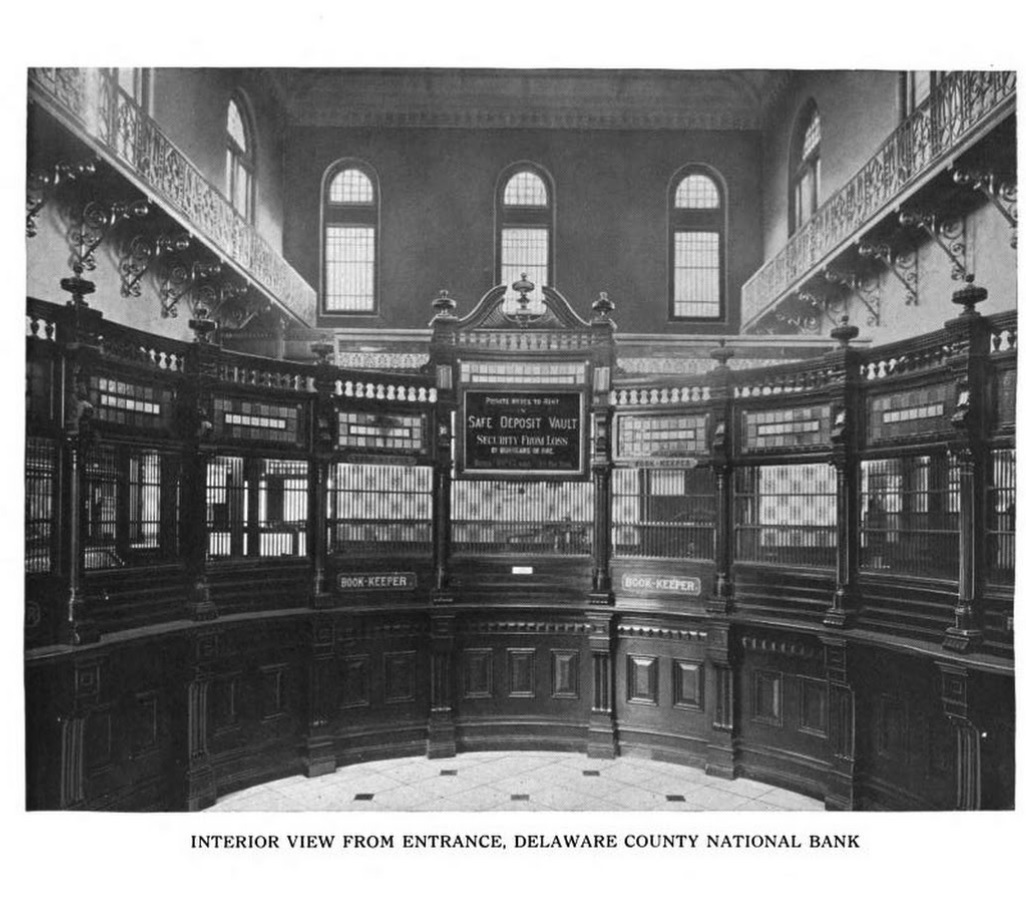
Interior of the Delaware County National Bank.

== Sources ==
- Ashmead, Henry Graham (1884). History of Delaware County, Pennsylvania. L.H. Everts & Co.
- Ashmead, Henry Graham (1914). History of the Delaware County National Bank. Press of the Chester Times.
- Cope, Gilbert; Ashmead, Henry Graham (1904). Historic Homes and Institutions and Genealogical and Personal Memoirs of Chester and Delaware Counties, Pennsylvania. The Lewis Publishing Company.
