= List of colonial governors of Pennsylvania =

This is a list of colonial governors of Pennsylvania.

== Proprietors ==
Three generations of Penns acted as proprietors of the Province of Pennsylvania and the Lower Counties (Delaware) from the founding of the colony until the American Revolution removed them from power and property. William Penn was granted the new proprietary colony in 1681 by Charles II of England in payment for debts owed to Penn's father. After Penn became ill in 1712, his second wife Hannah Callowhill Penn served as acting proprietor.

After William's death in 1718, interest in the proprietorship passed to his three sons by Hannah: John Penn "the American", Thomas Penn, and Richard Penn, Sr., with John inheriting the largest share and becoming the chief proprietor. When John died without children, his brother Thomas inherited his share and became chief proprietor.

When Richard Penn, Sr. died, his share passed to his son Governor John Penn. When Thomas Penn died, his share (and the chief proprietorship) passed to his son John Penn "of Stoke".

| # | Chief proprietor | Years | Percentage interest | Other proprietors |
|---|---|---|---|---|
| 1 | William Penn | 1681–1718 | 100% | Hannah Penn served as acting proprietor after 1712 |
| 2 | John Penn | 1718–1746 | 50% | 25%: Thomas Penn, 25%: Richard Penn, Sr. |
| 3 | Thomas Penn | 1746–1775 | 75% | 25%: Richard Penn Sr. (1746–71), John Penn (1771–75) |
| 4 | John Penn | 1775–1776 | 75% | 25%: John Penn |

== Governors ==
The government of Colonial Pennsylvania (and the Lower Counties) was conducted by a set of administrators in the name of the proprietors.

| # | Name | Title | Term | Seat |
|---|---|---|---|---|
| 1 | William Markham | Deputy Governor | 1681–1682 | Philadelphia |
| 2 | William Penn | Proprietor | 1682 | Philadelphia |
| 3 | Thomas Lloyd | President of Council | 1684–1688 | Philadelphia |
| 4 | John Blackwell | Deputy Governor | 1688 | Philadelphia |
| 5 | Thomas Lloyd | Deputy Governor | 1690 | Philadelphia |
| 6 | William Markham | Deputy Governor | 1691 | Philadelphia |
| 7 | Benjamin Fletcher | Governor | 1693 | New York |
| 8 | William Markham | Deputy Governor | 1693 | Philadelphia |
| 9 | Samuel Carpenter | Deputy Governor | 1694–1698 | Philadelphia |
| 10 | William Penn | Proprietor | 1699 | Philadelphia |
| 11 | Andrew Hamilton | Deputy Governor | 1701–1703 | Philadelphia |
| 12 | Edward Shippen | President of Council | 1703–1704 | Philadelphia |
| 13 | John Evans | Deputy Governor | 1704–1709 | Philadelphia |
| 14 | Charles Gookin | Deputy Governor | 1709–1717 | Philadelphia |
| 15 | William Keith | Deputy Governor | 1717–1726 | Philadelphia |
| 16 | Patrick Gordon | Deputy Governor | 1726–1736 | Philadelphia |
| 17 | James Logan | President of Council | 1736 | Philadelphia |
| 18 | George Thomas | Deputy Governor | 1738–1747 | Philadelphia |
| 19 | Anthony Palmer | President of Council | 1747 | Philadelphia |
| 20 | James Hamilton | Deputy Governor | 1748–1754 | Philadelphia |
| 21 | Robert Hunter Morris | Deputy Governor | 1754–1756 | Philadelphia |
| 22 | William Denny | Deputy Governor | 1756–1759 | Philadelphia |
| Acting and 23 | James Hamilton | Deputy Governor | 1759–1763 | Philadelphia |
| 24 | John Penn | Lieutenant Governor | 1763–1771 | Philadelphia |
| Acting and 25 | Richard Penn | Lieutenant Governor | 1771–1773 | Philadelphia |
| 26 | John Penn | Lieutenant Governor | 1773–1776 | Philadelphia |

During the British occupation of Philadelphia from 26 September 1777 until June 1778, Joseph Galloway was "in charge of policing the city, and of imports and exports".

== See also ==
- List of governors of Pennsylvania

== Sources ==
- Miller, Randall M. and William Pencak, eds. Pennsylvania: A History of the Commonwealth. University Park: The Pennsylvania State University Press, 2002.
- Treese, Lorett. The Storm Gathering: The Penn Family and the American Revolution. University Park: The Pennsylvania State University Press, 1992. ISBN 0-271-00858-X.
