= William Penn Landing Site =

- U.S. National Register of Historic Places
- Pennsylvania state historical marker
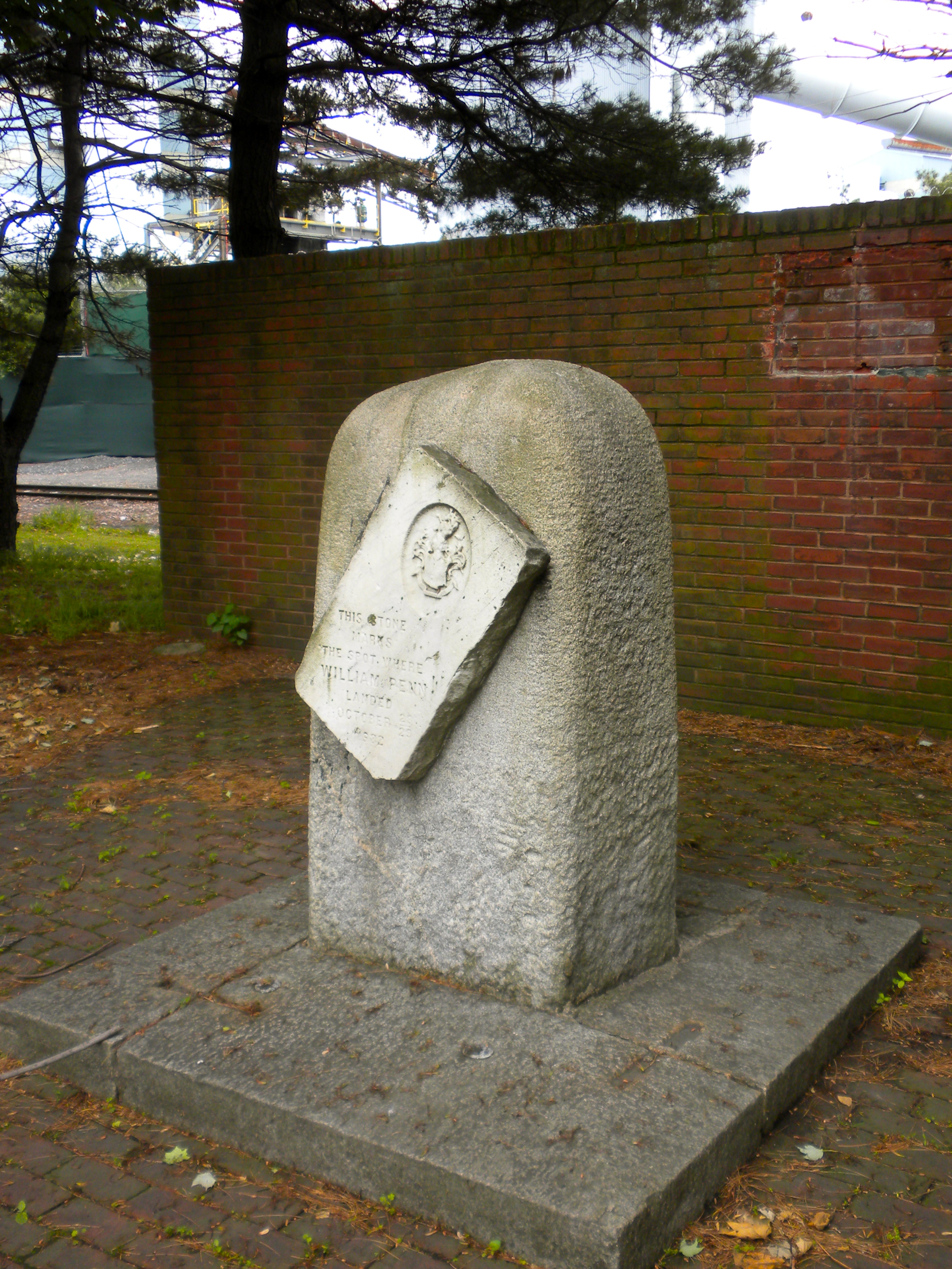
- William Penn Landing Site Monument, May 2010

- Location within Pennsylvania Location within the United States
- Location: Penn and Front Sts., Chester, Pennsylvania
- Coordinates: 39°50′36″N 75°21′41″W
- Area: less than one acre
- Built: 1882
- Architect: Struthers, John
- NRHP reference No.: 71000703

Significant dates
- Added to NRHP: March 11, 1971
- Designated PHMC: October 13, 1947

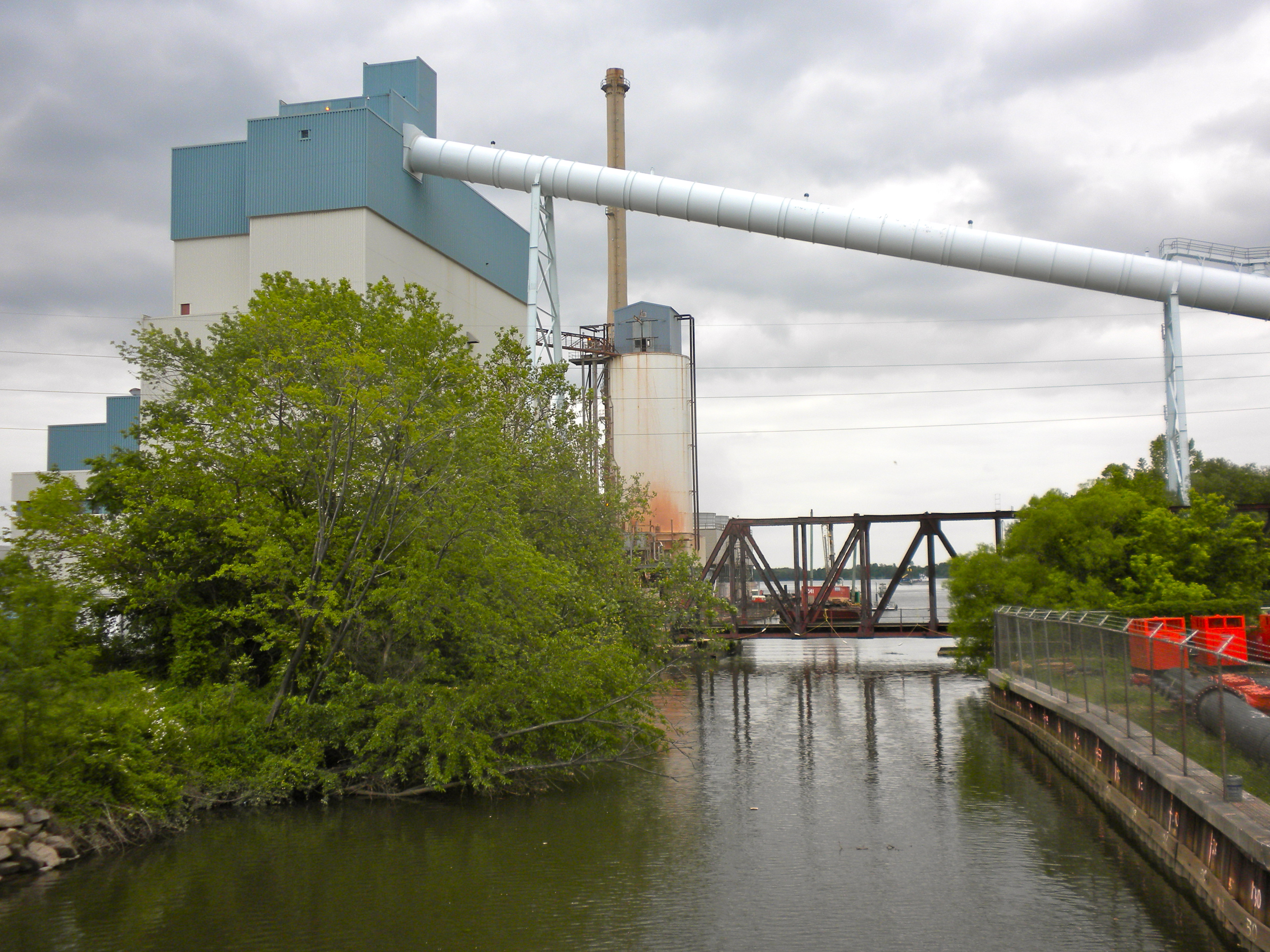
The mouth of Chester Creek, just north of the landing site

The monument at the William Penn Landing Site in Chester, Pennsylvania marks the spot of the first landing of William Penn on the territory of Pennsylvania, on October 28 or 29, 1682 (O.S.). Penn, the founder of the Province of Pennsylvania, landed in the only town in the province, then known as Upland.

The monument at the site was designed by John Struthers, erected on November 8 and dedicated November 9, 1882 (N.S.) The landing site was placed on the National Register of Historic Places in 1971.

== Founding of Pennsylvania ==
After receiving the charter for the Province of Pennsylvania on March 4, 1681 from King Charles II of England, Penn appointed William Markham as Deputy Governor on April 10, 1681. Markham proceeded to New York, which had exercised nominal control of the area of Pennsylvania since 1676, where he presented his credentials. On August 3, 1681, Markham arrived in Upland, the only town in the province. About 500 Europeans lived in the province at that time, mostly in the present day counties of Delaware and Chester centered around Upland. Swedish and Dutch settlers had lived in the area since the 1630s, and Quakers had moved there from West Jersey starting about 1675. What little government there was, had been provided by the Upland Court under the laws of James, Duke of York, nominally supervised by the Governor of New York. The Upland Court exercised judicial, legislative, and executive authority.

Markham appointed judges to the court and members to a council. He also met with Charles Calvert, 3rd Baron Baltimore in Upland, who informed him that the Pennsylvania-Maryland border was about 12 miles north. Markham apparently informed Penn of the border dispute. Penn then arranged to receive deeds from the Duke of York to the "three lower counties" which now comprise the state of Delaware, thus strengthening his claims further north on the Delaware River.

Penn sailed aboard the ship Welcome from Deal, Kent on the English Channel on August 30, 1682 and first landed in America on October 27, 1682 at New Castle, Delaware. In New Castle he performed the ancient "turf and twig" ceremony known as the livery of seisin to take possession of New Castle County. Within two days he arrived at Upland, about 18 miles north on the Delaware River.

According to Smith, immediately after arriving in Upland, Penn asked a companion from Chester in England to rename the town, and he promptly renamed it Chester. Penn landed near the log house of Robert Wade, which was also used as the first Quaker meetinghouse in the area, and spent the night in the house. Wade, in 1675, had bought the property which had been owned by the daughter of the governor of New Sweden, Johan Printz. Quaker minister William Edmundson had mentioned the house in his journal in 1676.

== Monument ==
The granite monument stands about five feet tall and has Penn's coat of arms on the side facing inland. The monument was paid for by members of the Historical Society of Pennsylvania and the Penn Club to mark the 200th anniversary of the landing. A special train was run from Philadelphia to Chester for the occasion, and the dedication was celebrated at length. The site is now about 100 feet inland, with railroad tracks separating it from the Delaware River in an industrial section of Chester, just south of Chester Creek.

== Sources ==
- Ashmead, Henry Graham; William Shaler Johnson (1883). Historical sketch of Chester, on Delaware. Republican Steam Print. House. pp. 336.
- Smith, George (1862). History of Delaware County, Pennsylvania: From the Discovery of the Territory Included Within Its Limit to the Present Time, with a Notice of the Geology of the County, and Catalogues of Its Minerals, Plants, Quadrupeds, and Birds, Written Under the Direction and Appointment of the Delaware County Institute of Science. H.B. Ashmead. pp. 581.
- ExplorePAHistory.com, The Vision of William Penn, Chapter Two: Penn's Arrival, accessed 2010-05-19
