= Thomas Day (pirate) =

Thomas Day (fl. 1696–1697, first name occasionally John) was a pirate and privateer active off the American east coast. He is known for being one cause of increasing tensions between the Governors of Maryland and Pennsylvania.

== History ==
Late in 1696 Captain Ball of the ship Kent from Bristol died en route to the Americas and was succeeded by the ship's mate, Thomas Day. He put into port at the Province of South Carolina, condemning the ship and selling off its cargo of indigo and sugar. With the proceeds he purchased a brigantine and sailed north with intentions of becoming a privateer. In Pennsylvania he resupplied and was granted a privateering commission by Governor William Markham of Pennsylvania. A French privateer had recently taken several vessels nearby and when Day offered to patrol the region in exchange for men and supplies, Markham accepted. Robert Quary spoke in his favor: "Sir (I said) this thing could not have happened at a better time, for here is Captain Day who has a gang of brisk fellows. Add thirty or forty to them from the lower counties, and give Day a commission to command them."

Maryland officials were angry that some of Henry Every's pirates crew were still at large in Pennsylvania, where they paraded openly and were never seriously detained. They suspected that with such a large crew, Day's true intention was to sail for the Red Sea on the Pirate Round route. Markham originally replied that "that Day was down the river out of his reach, and that they had not force in the province to command him." Maryland Governor Francis Nicholson ordered Captain Josiah Daniell of the Royal Navy warship HMS Prince of Orange to dispatch two of his lieutenants and sixty men to apprehend Day, but Pennsylvania authorities challenged them and refused to let them proceed, now citing Day's commission.

Nicholson and Markham fired angry letters back and forth, writing to the Council of Trade and Plantations and to Pennsylvania's proprietor William Penn. Daniell and Nicholson accused Markham of not only harboring pirates but profiting from their activities, which he vehemently denied: "Governor Nicholson alleges that I got great matters by Day's commission, but I solemnly declare that I had not the value of a farthing for it, and gave it only in view of the common danger."

Day's crew attempted to recruit more volunteers for their voyage, some of which gave depositions for Governor Nicholson. One such testimonial preserved part of Day's pirate Articles: "part of the Articles (according to the best of his remembrance) were that if it so hap'ned that if they got a better ship & quitted the Brigantine that then they should allow such a proportion of their gettings in satisfaction of the sd Brigantine, that he that stole to the value of a piece of 8 from another should be put upon a maroon'd Island, that he that was wounded in any engagement should have such an overplus share of slaves if they took any, with several more such like articles."

After provisioning in Pennsylvania and obtaining his commission, Day took his brigantine to the Caribbean, sailing to Curacao and then across the Atlantic to Holland. From Curacao he may have sold his brigantine and sailed to Holland on his own, or may have remained in command of it while he sailed to Holland. At least one source says Day captured another ship en route, putting back into Charleston to sell it and its cargo before proceeding in July 1697.

Nicholson himself would continue his anti-piracy crusade, personally boarding HMS Shoreham in 1700 when it sailed against pirate Louis Guittar.

== See also ==
- Admiralty court – Nicholson pushed for establishment of these in the American Colonies to try pirates locally, a move opposed by William Penn.
- Jacob Leisler and Benjamin Fletcher – two other colonial Governors who, like Markham, were frequently accused of collaborating with pirates.
