= Frame of Government of Pennsylvania =

First constitution of Pennsylvania, written by William Penn

The Frame of Government of Pennsylvania was a proto-constitution for the Province of Pennsylvania, a proprietary colony granted to William Penn by Charles II of England. The Frame of Government has lasting historical importance as an important step in the development of American and world democracy.

== History ==
William Penn, an English Quaker, sought to construct a new type of community with religious toleration and a great deal of political freedom. It is believed that Penn's political philosophy is embodied in the West Jersey Concessions and Agreements of 1677, which is an earlier practical experience of government constitution prior to the establishment of Pennsylvania. Although his authorship of the Concession is questioned, it is believed that he gave his full consent to it as the trustee of that colony. In the concession, all legislative power was granted to an assembly selected by the "inhabitants, freeholders and proprietors" of the colony. A commission was to be appointed by the assembly as its executive. The government structure in West Jersey demonstrated the enlightened constitutional theory that Penn had been promoting.

Also under the influence of republican political theory and humanism, the first version of the Frame of Government of Pennsylvania (now known as the Frame of 1682) incorporated a few pioneering ideas, which were later developed into important elements of modern constitutionalism. It required capital punishment to be applied to a strictly limited scope of criminal offenses only, including murder and treason. Freedom of worship in the colony was to be absolute. The assembly could bring a request of impeachment of the governor before the council for its trial. Unconstitutional laws should be invalidated, although it did not specifically grant courts the power to declare the unconstitutionality. It included an amendment process where six-sevenths of the legislature and the governor had to approve any change. However, the government structure speculated by the Frame of 1682 was far less liberal than that in West Jersey Concessions and Agreements of 1677.

=== The Frame of 1682 ===
The Frame of 1682 constituted a parliament consisting of two houses. The upper house, or the council, consisted of 72 members, including the first 50 purchasers of 5,000 acres or more in the colony and had the exclusive power to propose legislation. They were also authorized to nominate all officers in church and state and supervise financial and military affairs through committees. The lower house, or the assembly, consisted of smaller landowners. It had no power to initiate legislation but could accept or reject the council's legislative proposal only. The two-house parliament assists the governor with his executive functions.

Commentators believe that the Frame of 1682 was significantly influenced by Penn's supporters, primarily the earliest landholders in the colony. Little direct evidence suggested that they imposed a pressure upon the government constitution process. However, it is believed that the earliest settlers, who heavily invested in Pennsylvania, demanded a voice in constructing the framework of government.

William Markham, a trusted deputy executive of Penn in the colony for many years, commented:

"I knew very well [the Frame of Government] was forced upon him by friends who unless they received all that they demanded would not settle the country."

This partly explained Penn's deviation from his political ideas on government constitution to accommodate the demands of the settlers.

One of the most controversial provisions in the Frame of 1682 was if the governor should be allowed a veto to legislation presented by the parliament. To attract colonists, Penn had at first reserved himself only a single vote in the council and no power to reject legislation passed by the assembly. However, the Frame of 1682, in its final form, granted the proprietor a greater power – he was allowed a treble vote in the council and a veto in the legislative process.

In December 1682, an assembly of 42 men was convened to ratify the Frame of 1682. Although leading Quakers secured their places in the assembly, their proposal to establish a proprietary government was adamantly opposed by the non-Quakers in the assembly, including representatives from the Lower Counties, which had been under the light control of the deputy governors appointed by the Duke of York (later James II & VII.) In particular, they rejected the monopoly of the council in initiating legislation and requested a more powerful assembly. As a result, the Frame of 1682 was voted down.

=== Frame of 1683 ===
An assembly convened in 1683 to model a new frame of government in place of the rejected Frame of 1682. The tension which resulted in the rejection of the Frame of 1682 remained – although leading Quakers dominated the council, half of the seats in the assembly were occupied by non-Quakers from the Lower Counties who were steadfastly against the concentration of power to Quaker elites.

The proprietor's voting power in the legislative process remained one of the major concerns in framing the government. As provided in the colonial charter granted by the King, laws were to be made by the proprietor. Thus, it would be a violation of the charter if the proprietor did not possess a veto power in legislation. Over lengthy debate, Penn managed to convince the assembly that the proprietor's veto power was necessary, but guaranteed that he would exercise the power only with the council's advice and consent.

Once again, the assembly sought to enlarge its role and insisted that it be granted to power to initiate legislation, as it demanded when it rejected the Frame of 1682. Although it was regarded as unacceptable to both the proprietor and the council, they conceded that the assembly is allowed to confer with the council before passing a law. A compromised frame of government, or the Frame of 1683, was eventually approved by the assembly. It provided that all laws should be passed "by the Governor and the freemen in Council and Assembly met", and granted the governor a right to approve or veto.

However, the proprietary governance speculated by the Frame of 1683 did not function effectively after Penn returned to England in 1684. He relied on the council to act as governor collectively in the first few years during his absence. However, the council neglected Penn's constitutional authority and promulgated laws without obtaining approval from Penn or the King. Penn subsequently appointed five commissioners to replace the council as his deputy executive. Having granted any three of the commissioners a power to enact, annul or vary laws "as if I myself were there", he instructed the commissioners to annul the laws passed without his approval. However, the commissioners never carried out such instructions. In 1687, Penn appointed John Blackwell to replace the five commissioners as a single executive. As an aggressive Puritan governor, Blackwell clashed with the Quakers' assembly immediately after he was appointed. The disorder in Pennsylvania and William III's increasing distrust in Penn led to the suspension of Penn's charter as the colonial proprietor in 1692.

=== Frame of 1696 (Markham's Frame) ===
Penn's charter was restored in 1694. Presumably, he intended his colonists to return to the Frame of 1683, as one of the conditions on which his charter was restored was that the colony should be under proprietary governance. William Markham, the lieutenant governor commissioned by Penn in 1694, ruled the colony imperialistically and acted aggressively towards the assembly. However, certain practical needs in the colony significantly changed the political structure and dramatically resulted in liberal governance in this period, which was reflected in the Frame of 1696 (also known as Markham's Frame).

The assembly continued to make effort to further its power in the 1690s. In March 1695, David Lloyd, the chief spokesman of the Quakers, warned that there was no special virtue in returning to the Frame of 1683, and proposed a charter granting the Assembly a controlling role, including the sole power to initiate legislation. The council turned to support the shift of power from itself to the assembly in anticipation of a possible reestablishment of a royal government. The Quakers dominating the council understood that with Penn's charter under heavy attack by neighboring governors and English government officials, the reestablishment of royal government was "highly possible – even probable". In that situation, the Quakers found it necessary to invest the assembly with "the widest possible powers in advance of such a change". The council might be appointed by a royal governor and thus susceptible to a royal control. However, the assembly would always be elected. Outnumbering other factions, including the Anglicans, the Quakers believed that they would be able to dominate in the assembly. Thus, even if the Quakers lost their control over the council, they could still operate from the assembly to defend against a royal control.

In response to the Quakers' request, William Markham, the lieutenant governor and a member of the Church of England, took it as an opportunity to urge the Quaker-dominated assembly to cooperate in appropriating fund for military preparations, and promised that a discussion of constitutional revision would become possible if the military appropriation bill was passed by the assembly. Although having been committed to nonviolence and consciously objecting to participating in wars, Quakers compromised in this regard in exchange for a more powerful assembly. Coupled with a bill raising a fund of £300 for military use, the assembly passed a new frame of government, which is known as the Frame of 1696, or Markham's Frame. The new frame significantly changed the allocation of political power within the legislature by conferring upon the assembly the power to initiate legislation, sit on its own adjournment and judge the qualifications of its members. It also reduced the size of the legislature to a more manageable level – each county elected only two representatives to the council and four to the assembly. In addition, it provided for more stringent voting requirements to exclude non-Quakers from voting. A person needed to reside in the colony for two years before he could vote, suggesting an attempt to diminish the strength of the ever-growing number of non-Quaker immigrants newly arrived in the colony. In rural areas, where Quakers had a dominant representation in the population, the voting requirement was relaxed to include all freeholders with 50 acres rather than 100 acres as before. In urban areas where the number of non-Quakers was growing, the voting requirement was tightened to exclude anyone without a £50 estate free of debts.

The validity of the Frame of 1696 was questionable, as Markham did not have a conceivable right to approve it. It was never approved by Penn either – actually, Penn criticized it harshly. However, it functioned as the colonial constitution in practice for several years until Penn returned to Pennsylvania in 1699.

=== Frame of 1701 (The Charter of Privileges) ===
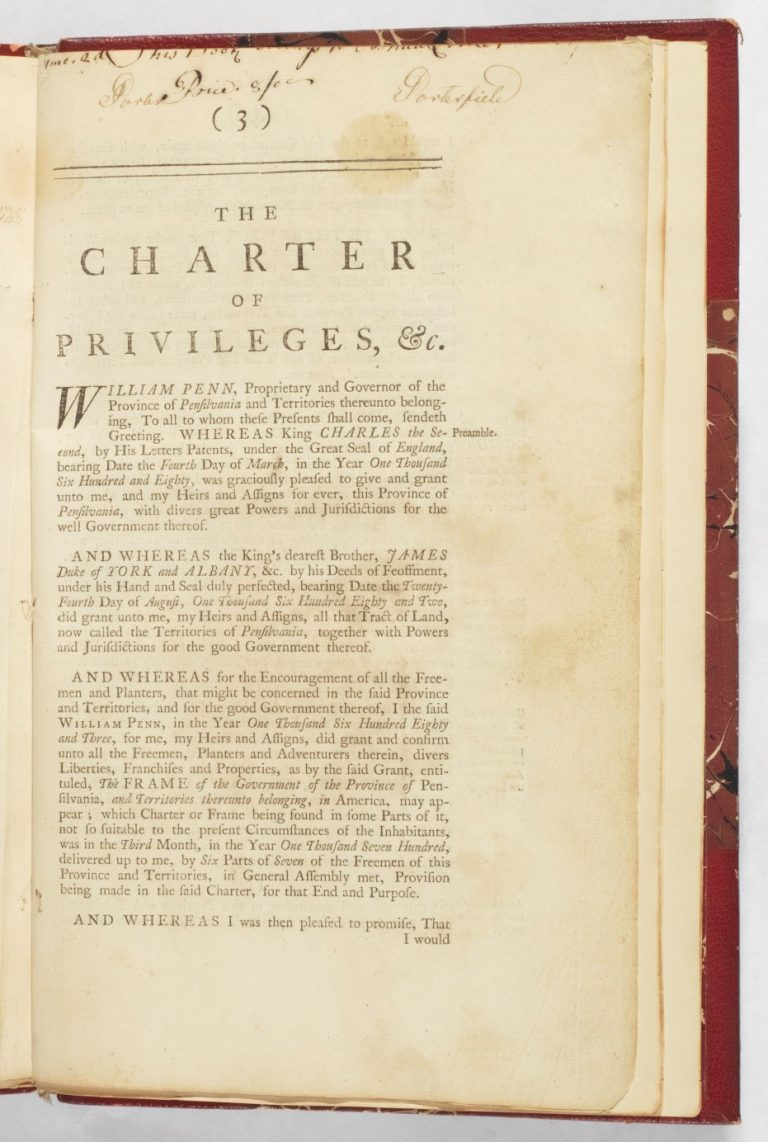
Pennsylvania Charter of Privileges

After his 15 years' absence, Penn returned to Pennsylvania in 1699 and found the assembly resisting his proprietary authority. His attempts to reinforce proprietary governance turned out to be unpopular. Hostility towards proprietary politics and desire for the legislature's autonomy prevailed among the Quaker elite. In 1701, on the eve that Penn left Pennsylvania to defend his colonial charter before the King in London, the assembly presented him with a new draft of the frame of government, which is subsequently known as the Frame of 1701, or the Charter of Privileges.

The Frame of 1701 further strengthened the controlling role of the assembly. An elective council was not even mentioned in the legislative process, and thus the assembly became the sole legislative authority. Meanwhile, the assembly obtained several Anglo-Saxon standard parliamentary privileges constitutionally for the first time: the right to prepare legislative bills, elect its own officers, appoint committees, sit on its own adjournment, judge the qualifications of its own members, and impeach officers of government. The assembly was to be elected annually by freemen and composed of four representatives from each county. The governor may appoint a council to assist with executive affairs, the council does not have a role in the legislative process.

In addition, the Frame of 1701 required all claims relating to properties to be directed to ordinary courts of justice, and thus neutralized the power of the Board of Propriety, the center of proprietary land administration.

Another significant concession in the Frame of 1701 was that the Lower Counties, or Territories, are permitted to establish their home rules. In 1705, the Territories took advantage of this provision and set up their own assembly.

Although Penn steadfastly refused to approve the Frame of 1696, he yielded to the Frame of 1701, which was different from the Frame of 1696 only in details. Some writers regarded his concession as a sign of his losing control over the colony. He admitted that he approved the Frame of 1701 only because he saw a majority had been convinced by David Lloyd that it was a form of government "nearer to English methods, which they called for so often." Also, in anticipation of the possibility that his rights of government in the colony might be stripped of by the English Parliament, a more democratic governmental structure might provide the Quakers in the colony with a shelter from an arbitrary royal governor.

The Frame of 1701 remained the governing constitutional document in Pennsylvania in the following seventy-five years until the Pennsylvania Constitution of 1776 replaced it.

== Characteristics ==
The establishment of Pennsylvania may be the most successful effort of Quakers in colonizing in America. Penn's close relationship with the Crown significantly contributed to the success. His ruling over Pennsylvania was largely based on the royal charter, which curbed his political experiment and led to a hierarchical governmental structure. The compromise diluted the liberalism in the constitution of government, which Penn and his contemporary political thinkers had been promoting. However, the human rights provisions in the Frame of Government successfully reflected certain important values inherent in human thinking prevailing in the colony and Quakerism and contributed to the development of constitutionalism in America.

== Legacy and reception ==
The Frame of Government has been seen as a significant move towards democracy in America. The political philosophy expounded in the preface to the Frame of 1682 has often been cited and quoted. Voltaire applauded Penn's efforts, saying he might "with reason, boast of having brought down upon earth the Golden Age, which in all probability, never had any real existence but in his dominions."

The Supreme Court of the United States quoted the 1682 Frame of Government in a February 2019 decision regarding excessive fines imposed by the state of Indiana.
