= William Markham (governor) =

Deputy governor of colonial Pennsylvania (1635–1704)

William Markham (1635 – 12 June 1704) served as deputy governor of the Province of Pennsylvania. Markham was the acting governor of Pennsylvania from 1681 to 1682 and from 1693 to 1699. He was a member of the Church of England and tended to favor the interests of minority religious groups in the primarily Quaker colony.

== In Pennsylvania ==
On 10 April 1681, Markham was appointed by his first cousin, Governor William Penn, and served as acting governor while Penn was in England. Markham sailed for America soon after his appointment. He landed in Boston and made his way to New York where he showed his credentials and took official control of the Delaware territories which had also been given to Penn.

On 3 August 1681, Markham arrived in Upland (now Chester, Pennsylvania), the only town in the colony at that time. He assembled a governing council that included six Quakers and three other early colonists. As governor, Markham helped select the site for Philadelphia, bought land from the Indians along the Delaware River and Pennsbury Manor, and began the discourse with Lord Baltimore over the disputed boundary between Pennsylvania and Maryland.

Penn first arrived in Pennsylvania in October 1682 and relieved Markham of his duties. Markham became a representative for the colony in England and lobbied on its behalf in the boundary dispute with Maryland. He served in various other positions including secretary of the province, secretary to the proprietary, a commissioner to sell lands, and an auditor of accounts. Markham supported John Blackwell over Thomas Lloyd in their dispute over the governorship.

In 1691, Delaware was separated from Pennsylvania, and Markham became the acting deputy governor of the new colony. The Glorious Revolution overthrew the Stuart dynasty with which Penn had his connections. By 1693, he temporarily fell from court popularity and lost control of the colony. The crown gave official control to Benjamin Fletcher, but Markham served a second term as acting governor as Fletcher's deputy. Penn was reinstated as official governor in August 1694, but Markham maintained control of the colony until Penn's return from England in December 1699.

Markham had several disputes with the legislative body and issued his own version of the Frame of Government of Pennsylvania in an attempt to resolve some of this conflict. Markham's version of the Frame gave greater power to the lower house of the legislature, the General Assembly, and greatly weakened his executive power as well as that of the upper house, the Council. Markham was criticised by the surveyor-general of customs and fellow Governors such as Francis Nicholson for, among other things, allowing pirates such as Thomas Day to run rampant. Pennsylvania did not have the military capacity to protect the Delaware Bay. Penn also complained of fraudulent financial transactions with Markham, but still had him appointed, through the deputy governor, register-general of wills in 1703.
