= Darby Meeting =

Historic church in Pennsylvania, United States

- U.S. National Register of Historic Places
- Pennsylvania state historical marker
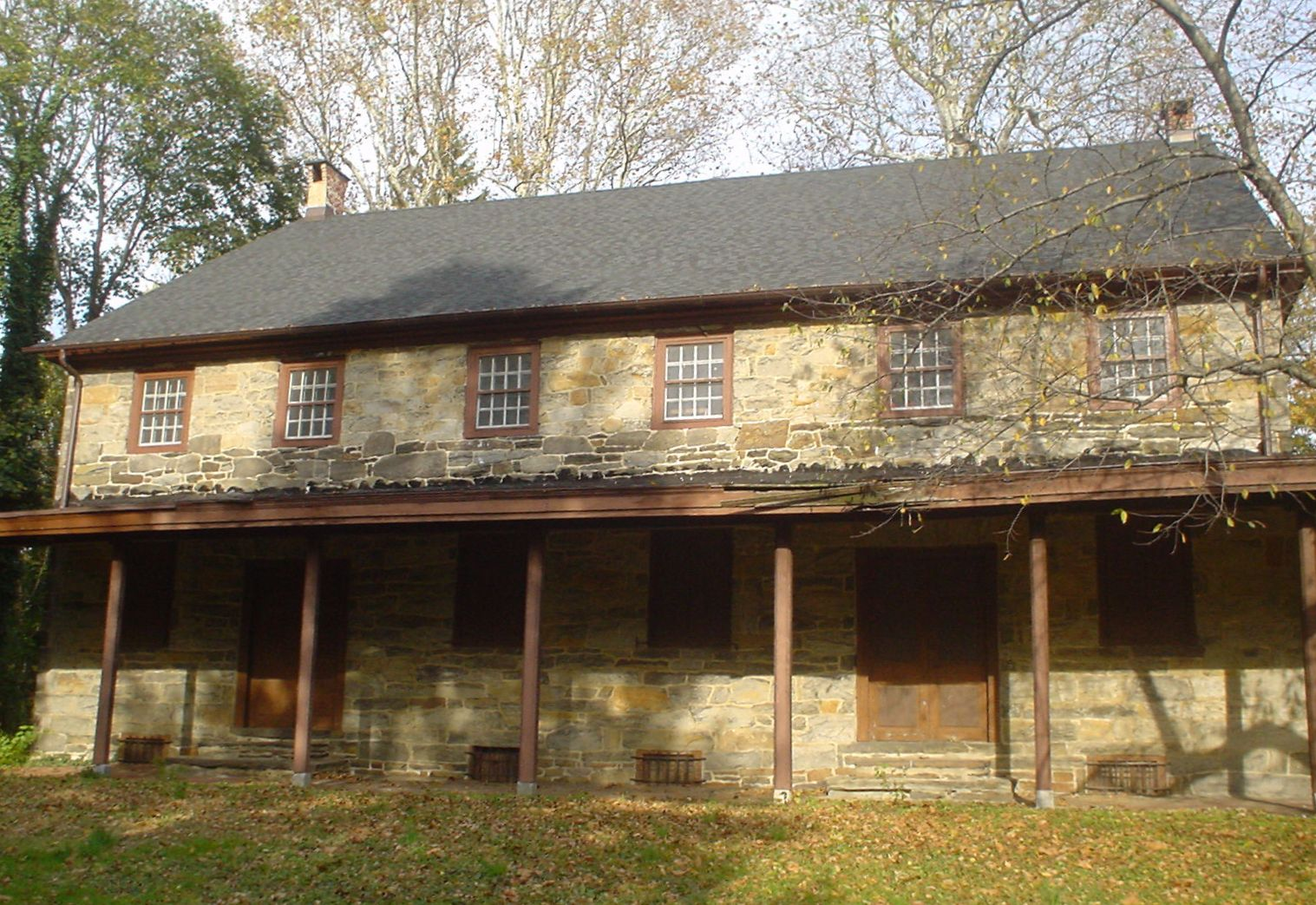
- Darby Meeting, November 2009

- Location within Pennsylvania Location within the United States
- Location: 1017 Main Street, Darby, Pennsylvania
- Coordinates: 39°55′15″N 75°15′48″W
- Area: 4 acres (1.6 ha)
- Built: 1805
- NRHP reference No.: 78002392

Significant dates
- Added to NRHP: September 13, 1978
- Designated PHMC: June 1952

The Darby Meeting or Darby Friends Meeting House is located in Darby, Pennsylvania. The first recorded minutes of the meeting are dated July 2, 1684, not long after William Penn landed in nearby Chester to establish the colony of Pennsylvania. The first Friends meeting house in Darby was a log cabin built in 1687. It was used during the Revolutionary War by Continental soldiers. The third and present building was built in 1805. During the War of 1812, it was used by the U. S. Army as a hospital.

The 2 1/2-story building follows the Quaker tradition of simple and solid buildings. Its design is similar to that of the Horsham Friends Meeting House with separate entrances for men and women. Its walls are coursed fieldstone with stuccoed gables at each end. Brick fireplaces are also on each end of the interior. A covered porch extends along three sides of the ground floor, with the porch roof supported by simple wooden posts. Wooden posts also support the interior balcony. Most of the benches and other furniture are built of pine, but the floor is oak. Electric lighting and the usual utilities have been added, but otherwise the building retains its original form.

It was added to the National Register of Historic Places on September 13, 1978.

The Darby Friends Meeting & the Darby Friends Schoolhouse (1019 Main st.) were officially recognized as part of the National Park Service's Underground Railroad NETWORK TO FREEDOM PROGRAM on October, 2, 2023. The research continues... As of May 2026, 71 Members have been documented as participating as stationmasters, conductors or stockholders.

== Darby Society of Friends ==
In 1682, prior to the coming of William Penn to his new Province, there had settled in this place eight Friends from England (three of them with families). These early settlers were Samuel Bradshaw and Thomas Worth from Oxton, county of Nottingham, John Blunston, Michael Blunston, George Wood, Joshua Fearne, Henry Gibbins and Samuel Sellers, from the county of Derby.

With the exception of that of Samuel Sellers, the Certificates of all these Friends from their Monthly Meetings in England are recorded upon the Darby Meeting minutes; the two from Nottinghamshire bearing date the 2.oth of the 1st Month, 1682., and those from the Meetings in Derbyshire being all dated in the 5th Mo., 1682. In the next year came Richard Bonsal, Edmund Cartlidge, Thomas Hood, John Bartram, and Robert Naylor from Derbyshire; John Hallowell, William Wood and Thomas Bradshaw from Nottinghamshire, and Richard Tucker from the county of Wiltshire.

It is not unnatural that this little body of people, severing ties in the old world to begin life again in the new, and coming, as they did, from almost the same neighborhood, should desire to give to their new home a name which would recall to them the old. For this reason, no doubt, they gave to the new settlement the name of Darby.

As most of the early settlers were Friends by convincement, some of them having suffered persecution for their faith, it is not likely that their religious meetings were suspended during their voyage, much less after their arrival. And yet it was not until 1684 that these Friends of Darby met together in a Monthly Meeting capacity where minutes were recorded. The first minute, dated the 2d of the 5th Mo., 1684, is to the effect that (( Samuel Sellers and Anna Gibens of Darby, declared their intentions of taking each other in Marriage, it being first tyme."

This first volume of minutes was transcribed at a later period and doubtless the minutes of some earlier sessions have been lost. The Meetings were held at the house of John Blunston, which is said to have stood nearly opposite this present Meeting House, near the Mill-race.

In a letter to Friends in England, dated from Philadelphia 'the 17th of the 1st Month, 1683, and signed by William Penn, Samuel Jennings, Christopher Taylor, John Blunston and many others, we read, (( For our meetings, more especially for worship, there are * * **in Pennsylvania, one at the Falls, one at the Governor's House, one at Colchester river, all in the County of Bucks; one at Tawcony, one at Philadelphia, both in that county, one at Darby at John Blunston's, one at Chester, one at Ridley at John Simcock's, and one at William Ruse's at Chichester in Cheshire. There be three monthly meetings of men and women for truth's service; in the county of Chester, one; in the County of Philadelphia, another, and in the county of Bucks, another. And we intend a Yearly Meeting in the 3rd Month next. Here our concern is, as it was in our native land, that we may serve the Lord's truth and People. "

That the neglect of holding a Monthly Meeting at Darby was a source of concern to the Friends at Chester, may be inferred from the following minutes: "At a Monthly Meeting held at Robert Wade's house ye 5th, of 12th. mo. 1682/3 It is concluded by ye said Meeting yt Thos. Brassey and James Kennerly speake to John Blunston or some of Darby Meeting to joyne with us in our Months Meeting to consider of & order ye necessary affaires belonging to ye same." "At a Monthly Meeting held at the house of Robert Wade the 5th. of 1st. month 168: it was agreed yt Thomas Brassey and Robert Wade should speake with some of ye members of Darby Meeting yt they would according to ye good order of Friends joyne with us in our Monthly Meeting."

Doubtless these concerns were not without effect) but there is no evidence that the Darby Friends ever joined themselves with the Meeting at Chester. It is probable) however, that they were represented at the Quarterly Meeting held at Chester the 4th. of the 12th. mo., 1683/4) at which it was "ordered yt Chester Monthly Meeting be held on ye. first weekly 2nd. day every month and Chichester Monthly Meeting to be ye second weekly 2nd. day every month and Darby Monthly Meeting be ye first weekly 4th. day in each month."

This is the first mention of a Monthly Meeting at Darby and it is not unreasonable to suppose that between this date, 12th. mo.'4th. 168~ and 5th. mo. 2nd. 1684) the date of our first minute) there were several Monthly Meetings held.

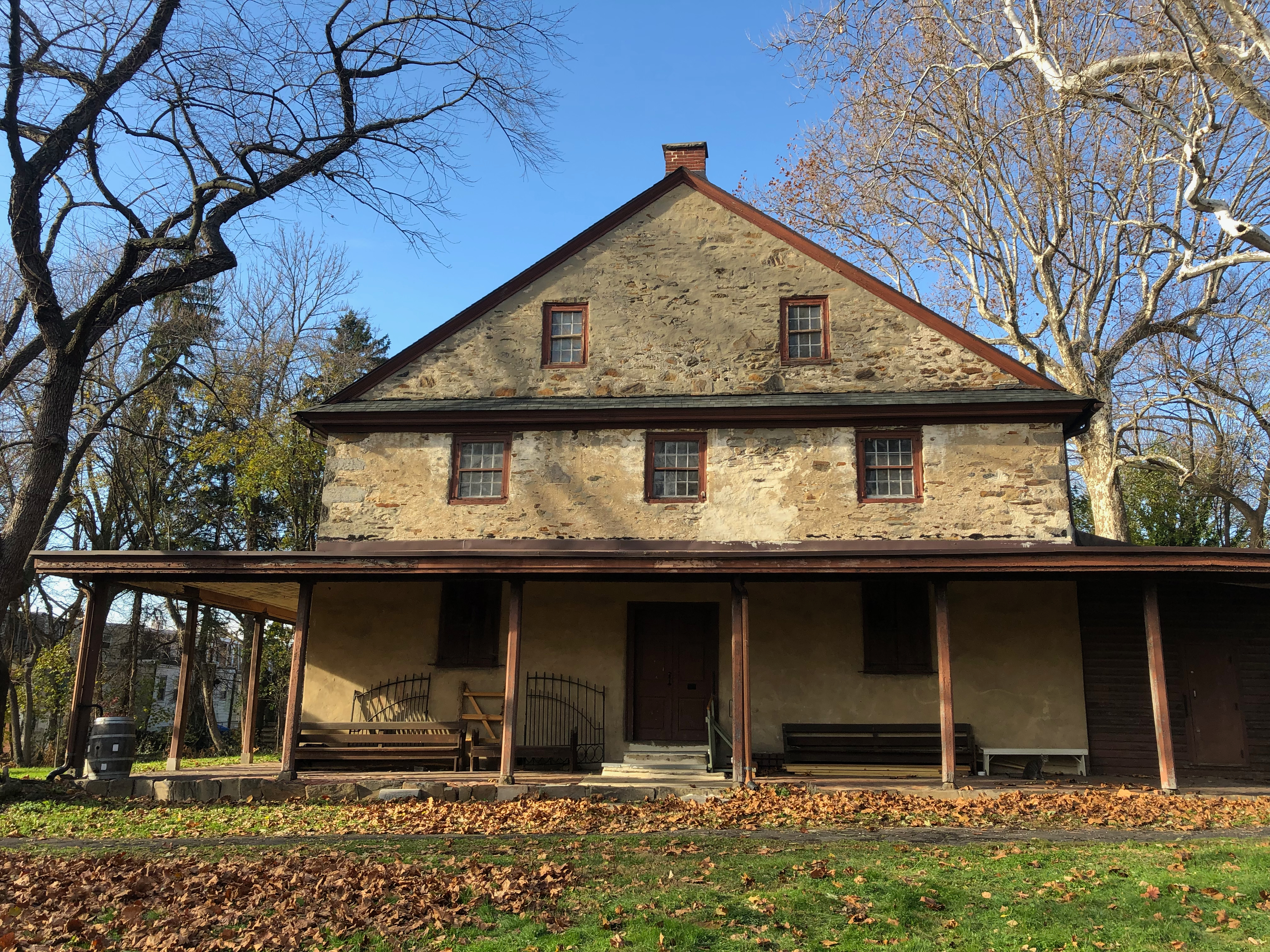
Side view of Darby Meeting, December 2022

== Notable burials ==
- John Bartram (1699-1777), botanist, horticulturist and explorer
- John Blunston: Founder of Darby, PA; 3x Speaker of the Colonial Assembly
- Martha Schofield: Educator

== See also ==
- National Register of Historic Places listings in Delaware County, Pennsylvania
- Darby Free Library, founded by Quakers in 1743. The current building stands about 300 yards south of the meetinghouse
