= Penn Wood High School =

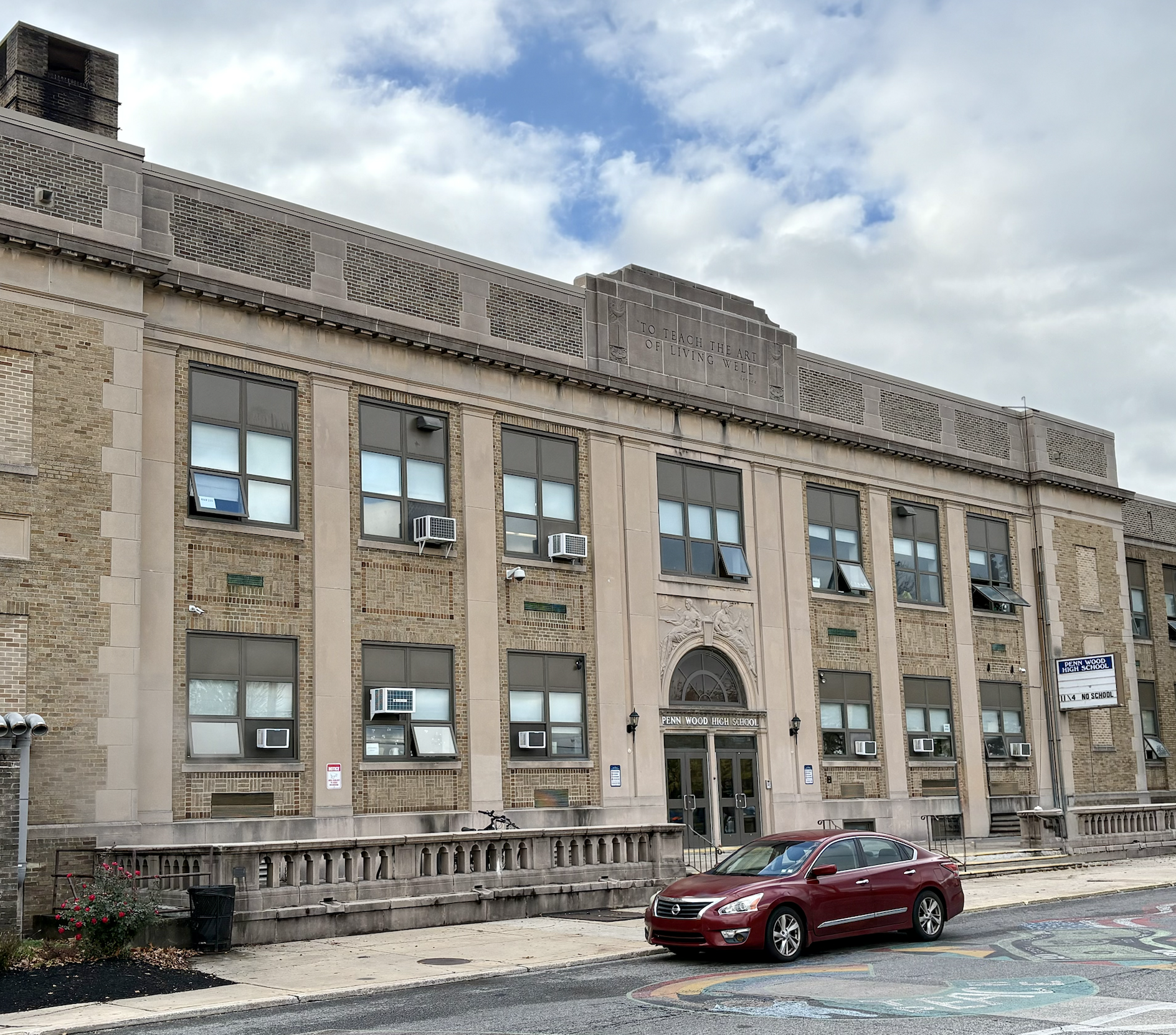
- Penn Wood High School, 2025

Location
- 100 Green Avenue; Lansdowne, Pennsylvania 19050; 39.9455292°N 75.2725847°W

Information
- Former names: Lansdowne High School, Lansdowne–Aldan High School
- Type: Public High School
- Motto: To Teach the Art of Living Well
- Established: 1927; 99 years ago
- School district: William Penn School District
- Principal: Stephen Chicano
- Grades: 10-12
- Gender: Coeducational
- Colors: Maroon; White; Navy Blue
- Athletics conference: Del Val League
- Nickname: Patriots
- Newspaper: The Penn Wood Gazette
- Feeder schools: Penn Wood Ninth Grade Academy
- Website: Penn Wood High School

Penn Wood High School is a public high school in Lansdowne, Pennsylvania. It is the only high school in the William Penn School District, which serves the boroughs of Aldan, Colwyn, Darby, East Lansdowne, Lansdowne, and Yeadon.

== History ==
Penn Wood High School, originally Lansdowne High School, was opened in 1927. The architect was Joseph Linden Heacock, and the builder was John McShain who went on to build the Kennedy Center, The Jefferson Memorial and The Pentagon. Today, it is one of the oldest public school buildings in Pennsylvania. Built in the Italian Renaissance style, the motto carved above the door reads "To Teach the Art of Living Well", attributed to Seneca. Carved in limestone below the motto are a female figure holding a Greek Temple, and a male figure holding a cog.

The school is the result of the 1982 merger of 3 previous high schools: Lansdowne-Aldan High School, Yeadon High School and Darby-Colwyn High School. The merger was ordered by the Pennsylvania Human Relations Commission in light of findings that the school district was racially segregated. The schools' merger prompted protests from white residents of Lansdowne and Aldan, which culminated in Aldan public officials suing unsuccessfully to secede from the school district in 1995.

The school suffered extensive fire damage due to suspected arson in 2013. Following an outpouring of local community support, Penn Wood was able to successfully re-open prior to the 2013-14 school year.

== Overview ==
Penn Wood offers a variety of clubs and extracurricular activities, including art and music programs, athletics, and academic enrichment opportunities.

=== Athletics ===
Penn Wood's sports teams are called the Patriots, and they compete in the Del Val League. The school's track and field program is particularly well regarded, and has produced multiple Olympic athletes. In 2009, Penn Wood's boys basketball team won the first PIAA Class AAAA State Championship in school history.

As of 2026, the school's athletics program includes:

Season	Sports
Fall	Cross-Country, Cheerleading, Football, Soccer, Girls Tennis, Volleyball
Winter	Basketball, Bocce, Indoor Track & Field, Wrestling
Spring	Baseball, Softball, Boys Tennis, Flag Football, Track & Field

== Notable alumni ==
=== Penn Wood alumni ===
- Dawn Burrell, Olympic long jumper, Sydney 2000
- Leroy Burrell, Olympic gold medalist sprinter, Barcelona 1992, former men's 100 meter dash world record holder, and Head Coach of Auburn University Track and Field
- Eric Futch, 2016 NCAA national champion hurdler
- Darrell Hill, Olympic shot put athlete, Rio 2016
- Duane Johnson, basketball player
- Kamar Jorden, football player
- Shawn Oakman, football player
- Kurt Vile, singer and songwriter

=== Pre-merger alumni ===
==== Darby-Colwyn High School ====
- James N. Robertson, member of the Pennsylvania House of Representatives
- Frank Sheeran, organized crime associate and inspiration for the film The Irishman

==== Lansdowne-Aldan High School ====
- Pat Croce, former Team President of the Philadelphia 76ers
- Bruce Harlan, Olympic gold and silver medalist diver, London 1948
- Carol McCain, director of the White House Visitors Office from 1981 to 1987

==== Yeadon High School ====
- Peter Liacouras, academic and President of Temple University
- John Rauch, football player and coach
- John Stanford, United States Army Major General and Superintendent of Seattle Public Schools
