= Darby Free Library =

Free public library

Coordinates: 39.9202°N 75.2631°W

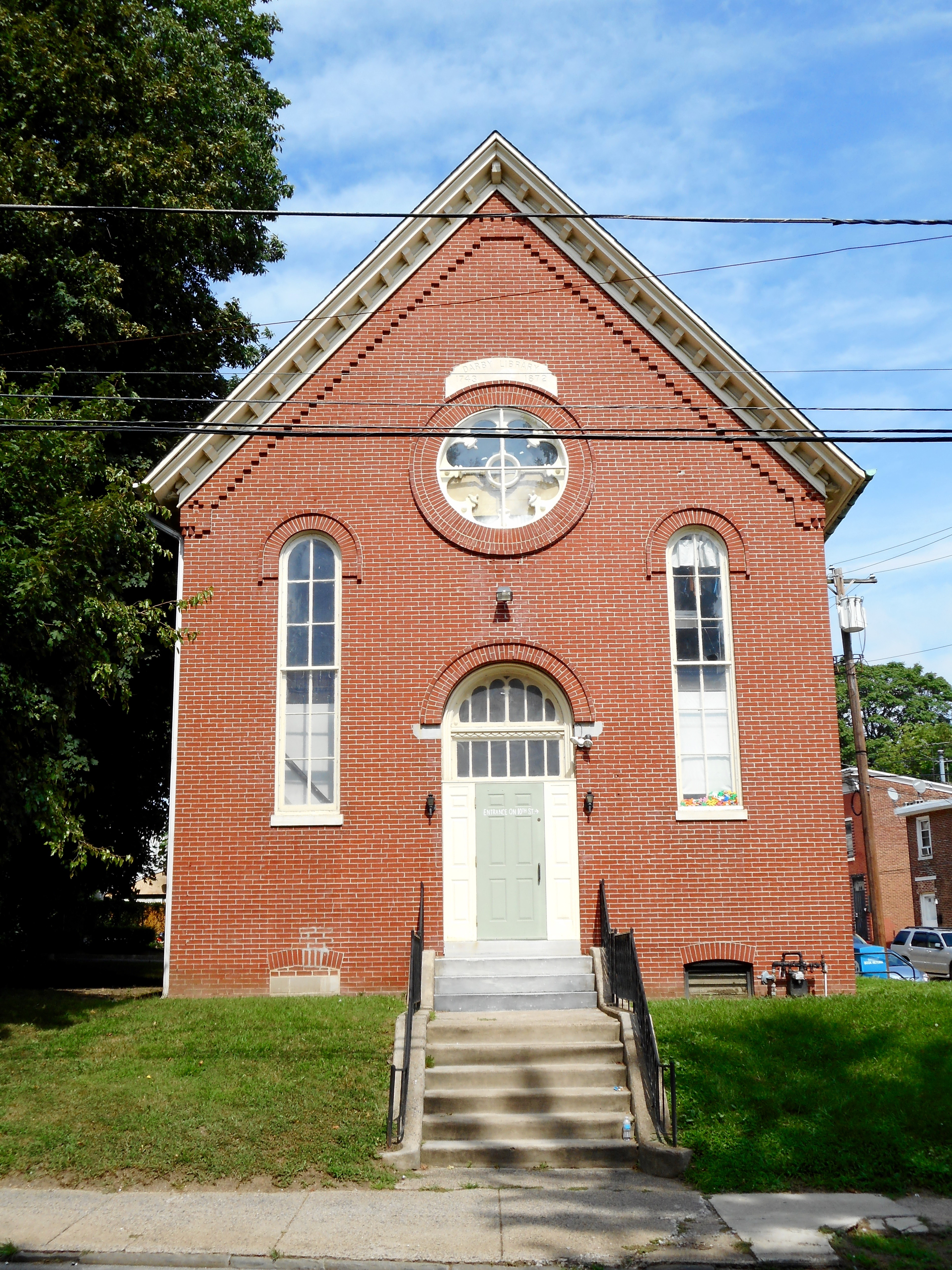
Darby Free Library's 1872 building at 1001 Main St. in Darby. The date stone above the rose window reads "Darby Library. 1743 1872"

Darby Free Library is a public library at 1001 Main Street in Darby Borough, Delaware County, Pennsylvania. Founded as the Darby Library Company in 1743 – just 12 years after Benjamin Franklin organized the Library Company of Philadelphia – it remains one of the oldest libraries in the United States. Although it was a subscription library until 1898, it claims to be "the oldest library in the United States in continuous service." The library celebrated its 275th anniversary in 2018.

== History ==
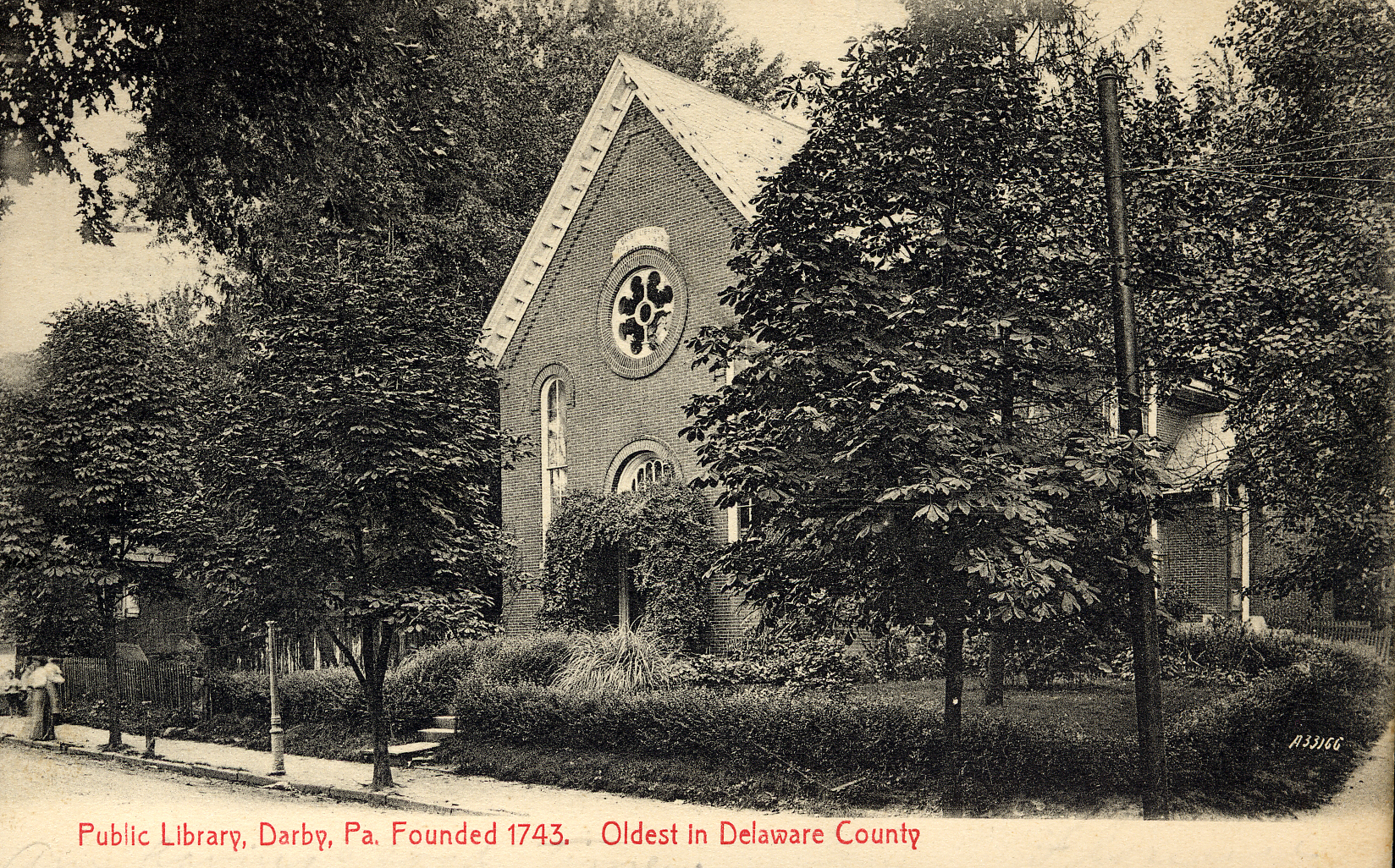
Library on a c. 1905 postcard

=== Founding ===
The library was organized on March 10, 1743 by 29 Quakers as a subscription library. Joseph Bonsall was elected Secretary, Nathan Gibson, Treasurer, and John Pearson was the first Librarian. Until 1872 library meetings were held in member's houses and the librarian kept the collection of books in a trunk.

Each subscriber pledged 20 shillings to join plus 5 shillings per year to continue his membership. £11-10s Sterling was used to buy the first books from England. With the help of botanists John Bartram (in America) and Peter Collinson (in England), who performed similar services for the Library Company of Philadelphia, the first books arrived from England on November 5, 1743,

These books included:

- 1 Vol. 1738 The Gentleman Instructed
- 1 Vol. 1729 Puffendorf’s Of the Law of Nature and Nations
- 8 Vol. 1736 * The Universal Spectator
- 8 Vol. 1741 The Turkish Spy
- 2 Vol. 1718 Tourneforte’s- A Voyage into the Levant
- 1 Vol. 1737 Whiston’s- A New Theory of the Earth
- 1 Vol. 1736 Addison’s Travels
- 1 Vol. 1736 Barclay’s Apology
- 1 Vol. 1738 Locke- Some Thoughts Concerning Education
- 1 Vol. 1738 Religion of Nature Delineated
- 1 Vol. 1741 Gordan’s Geographical Grammar
- 1 Vol. 1743 Sherlock- A Practical Discourse Concerning Death
- 1 Vol. 1717 Whiston- Astronomical Principles of Religion
- 1 Vol. 1740 Maundrel- A Journey from Aleppo to Jerusalem
- 1 Vol. 1740 Dycke’s New English Dictionary
- 1 Vol. 1733 Tull- The Horse-Hoing Husbandry
- 1 Vol. 1736 Blackmore- Creation, a Philosophical Poem
- 3 Vol. 1735 The Independent Whig
- 1 Vol. 1738 Wood’s Institute of the Laws of England
- 2 Vol. 1730 Milton’s Paradise Lost and Paradise Regained
- 2 Vol. 1702 Puffendorf- The compleat History of Sweden
- 2 Vol. 1736 Raleigh- The History of the World
- 2 Vol. 1743 Lediard- The Life of the Duke of Marlborough

Most of these books are still owned by the library and are on display there. The library continued to buy books from London until 1761 when they began buying books from David Hall, a Philadelphia bookseller and publisher. By 1761 the collection included 230 volumes.

=== After the Revolution ===
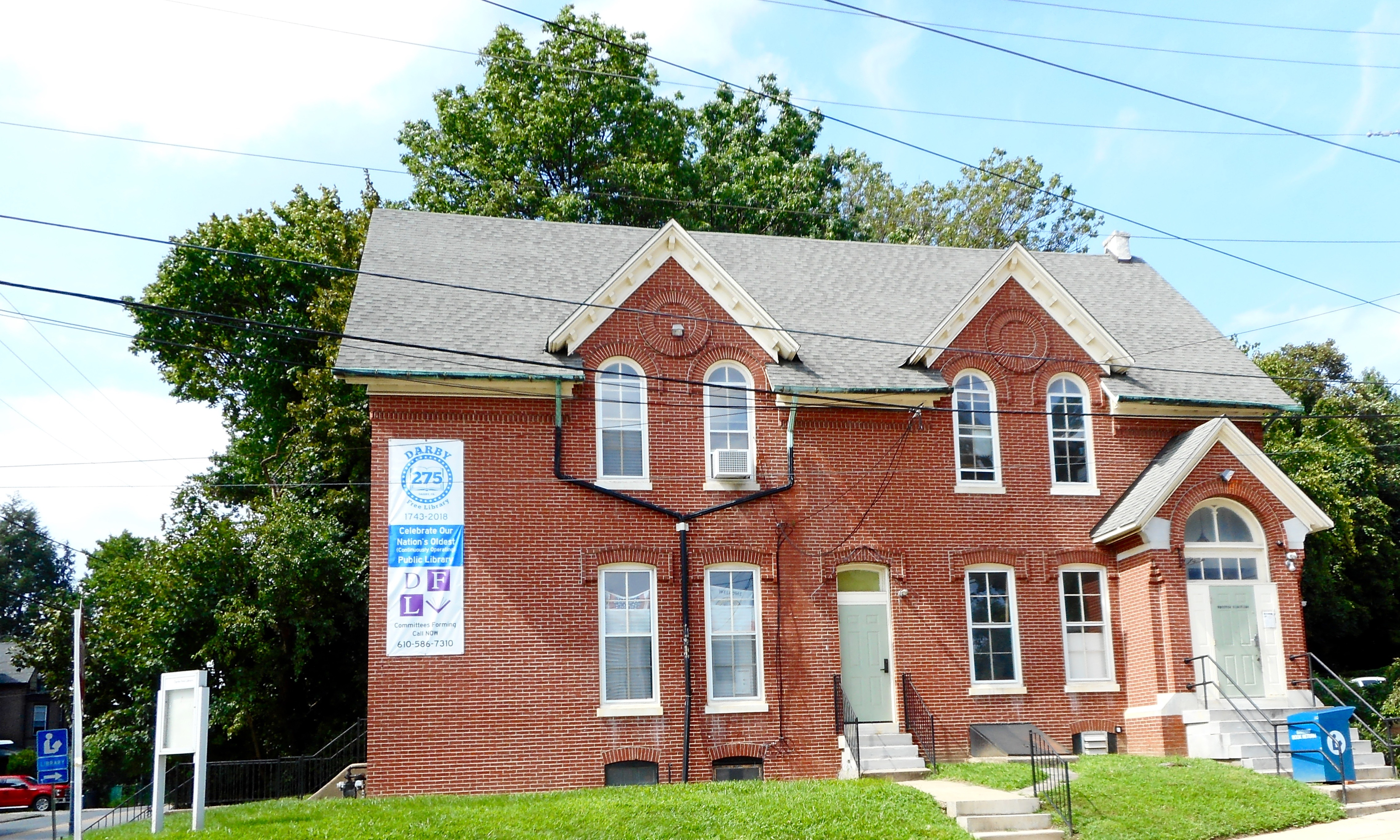
View from the south

An attempt was made in 1795 to purchase land to build a library building, but no property meeting the library's needs could be found at an affordable price. In 1819 Ann Paschall inherited a share in the library and became the first woman to be a member. She was not invited to the membership meetings however as the minutes state "her attendance at our meetings is dispensed with." In 1826 borrowing privileges were extended to anyone paying a $3 annual fee. Several books were sold from the collection soon after. One book, The Pupil of Pleasure that offended Quaker sensibilities, was burned.

In 1866 property was bought to build a permanent home for the library, just south of the Darby Friends Meetinghouse at the corner of 10th and Main Streets. The building was designed in the Italianate style by Benjamin D. Price and constructed by Charles Bonsall. It was completed in 1872 at a cost of $8,895.54. Price was known for designing churches and the library design in many ways resembles a church.

In 1898 the library became free and open to the public.

== See also ==
- List of public libraries in Delaware County, Pennsylvania
