= List of public libraries in Delaware County, Pennsylvania =

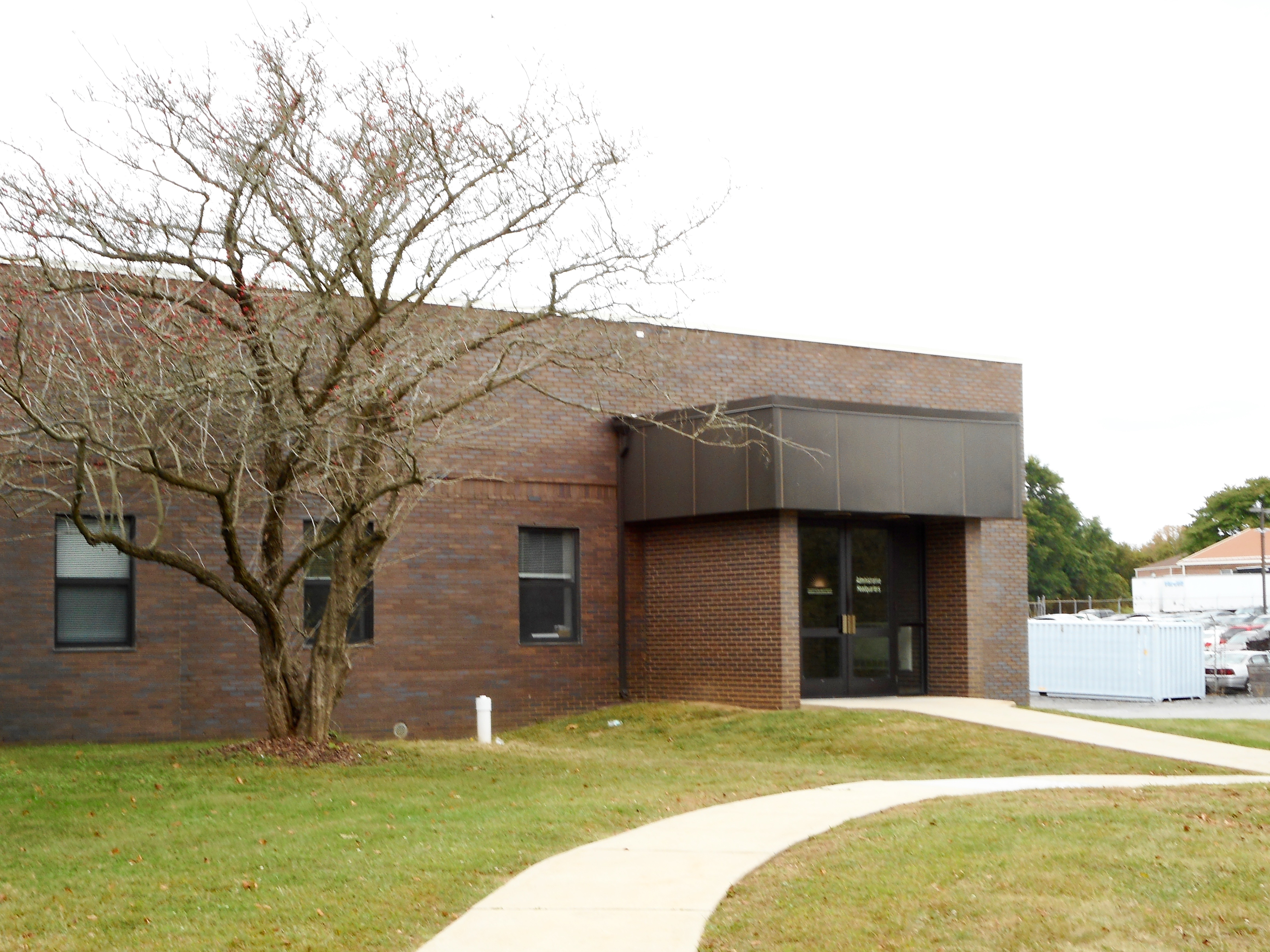
System office in Middletown Township

There are 30 public libraries in Delaware County, Pennsylvania. The Delaware County Libraries is a federation of 26 library organizations, with 28 branches. The law library in the county courthouse is not a member of the county system, but its holdings are listed in the system catalog. The Upper Chichester Library is also located in the county but not part of the system.

The libraries in the county system are mostly independent non-profit organizations which are funded by local municipalities, the Commonwealth of Pennsylvania through the county system, and from donations. Some of the libraries in the system are municipal entities. A library card from any library in the system is valid at all other libraries in the system and at most libraries in the state.

The county system serves 550,000 residents with a collection of 1,400,000 volumes. 2,150,000 items circulate per year.

Name	Image	Founded	Built	Location	Description
Aston Public Library		1977	c.1985	3270 Concord Road, Aston; 39.8676°N 75.4209°W	In the community center
Collingdale Public Library				823 MacDade Blvd. Collingdale; 39.9115°N 75.2786°W	
Darby Free Library		1743	1872	1001 Main Street, Darby; 39.9202°N 75.2631°W	Organized March 10, 1743 by 29 Quakers as a subscription library. First 45 books arrived from England on November 5, 1743, In 1898 the library became free and open to the public.
Folcroft Public Library		1940	1973	1725 Delmar Drive, Folcroft; 39.8941°N 75.2789°W	
Glenolden Library		1894	1939	211 S. Llanwellyn Ave., Glenolden; 39.8999°N 75.2927°W	
Haverford Township Free Library		1934		1601 Darby Road, Havertown 39.9815°N 75.3049°W	
Helen Kate Furness Library		1902	1916	100 N. Providence Road, Wallingford; 39.9045°N 75.3748°W	Founded to honor Shakespearean scholar Horace Howard Furness. He later endowed the library with $5,000 on the condition that it be named for his wife. Located on his former estate Lindenshade.
J. Lewis Crozer Library		1769	1877 (1st building); 1976 (current building)	620 Engle Street, Chester; 39.83783°N 75.3875°W	Founded February 14, 1769. Operated, with hiatuses during the Revolution, the War of 1812, and the Civil War, until 1871 when it was reorganized. Renamed Crozer Library in 1925. The current building, a former branch, is in Veterans Memorial Park.
Judge Francis J. Catania Law Library – Delaware County Courthouse		1851	1933 (4th floor of courthouse)	201 West Front Street, Media; 39.9197°N 75.3917°W	In the courthouse and open to the public, but very limited circulation
Lansdowne Public Library		1898	1982	55 S. Lansdowne Ave., Lansdowne, 39.9365°N 75.2716°W	
Marple Public Library				2599 Sproul Rd., Broomall; 39.9747°N 75.3633°W	In the municipal building
Mary M. Campbell Marcus Hook Public Library				10th & Green, Marcus Hook; 39.8194°N 75.4187°W	In the borough hall
Media-Upper Providence Free Library		1901	2016	1 E. Front Street, Media; 39.9190°N 75.3889°W	
Middletown Free Library	Front Entrance	1956	2021	464 S. Old Middletown Rd. Suite 3, Media, PA 19063	Attached to the community center. Main entrance at larger parking lot facing the fire station.
Newtown Public Library		1974	2003	201 Bishop Hollow Rd., Newtown Square; 39.9806°N 75.4079°W	Adjoins the township office
Norwood Public Library		1925	1951	513 Welcome Ave., Norwood; 39.8909°N 75.3019°W	
Prospect Park Free Library		1923		720 Maryland Ave., Prospect Park; 39.8881°N 75.3084°W	
Rachel Kohl Community Library		1979	1989	687 Smithbridge Road, Glen Mills; 39.8673°N 75.5133°W	
Radnor Memorial Library		1940	1980	167 W. Lancaster Ave., Wayne; 40.0429°N 75.3890°W	
Ridley Park Public Library		1888	1912	107 East Ward Street, Ridley Park; 39.8808°N 75.3232°W	A Carnegie Library
Ridley Township Public Library		1957	1971	100 East MacDade Blvd., Folsom; 39.8862°N 75.3291°W	In the Municipal Building
Sharon Hill				246 Sharon Ave., Sharon Hill; 39.9067°N 75.2724°W	
Springfield Township Library				70 Powell Road, Springfield; 39.9307°N 75.3299°W	Next to the Municipal Building
Swarthmore Public Library		1929	1951	121 Park Avenue, Swarthmore; 39.9015°N 75.3484°W	In the municipal building
Tinicum Memorial Public Library				620 Seneca St., Essington; 39.8686°N 75.2932°W	
Upper Chichester Library		2001		3374 Chichester Ave. #19, Boothwyn; 39.8369°N 75.4430°W	Small township-supported library in a shopping mall across from Chichester High School. Not part of the County Library system
Upper Darby Township/Sellers Library – Main Sellers Branch		1931	1975	76 South State Rd., Upper Darby; 39.9623°N 75.2733°W	Sellers library founded in 1934 and merged with the municipal library in 1935. Sellers moved into the historic Hoodland house in 1935, with a large modern style building built and connected to the house in 1975.
Upper Darby Township/Sellers Library – Municipal Branch				501 Bywood Ave., Upper Darby; 39.9592°N 75.2665°W	
Upper Darby Township/Sellers Library – Primos Branch				409 Ashland Ave., Primos; 39.9186°N 75.3051°W	
Yeadon Public Library				809 Longacre Blvd., Yeadon; 39.9362°N 75.2511°W	

== See also ==
- List of libraries in 19th-century Philadelphia
