= Sharon Hill =

Sharon Hill may refer to:

- Sharon Hill, Pennsylvania, a borough in Delaware County, Pennsylvania, United States
  - Sharon Hill station (SEPTA Regional Rail)
  - Sharon Hill station (SEPTA Route 102)
- Sharon A. Hill, geologist, science writer and speaker
