= John Stanford (general) =

United States Army general

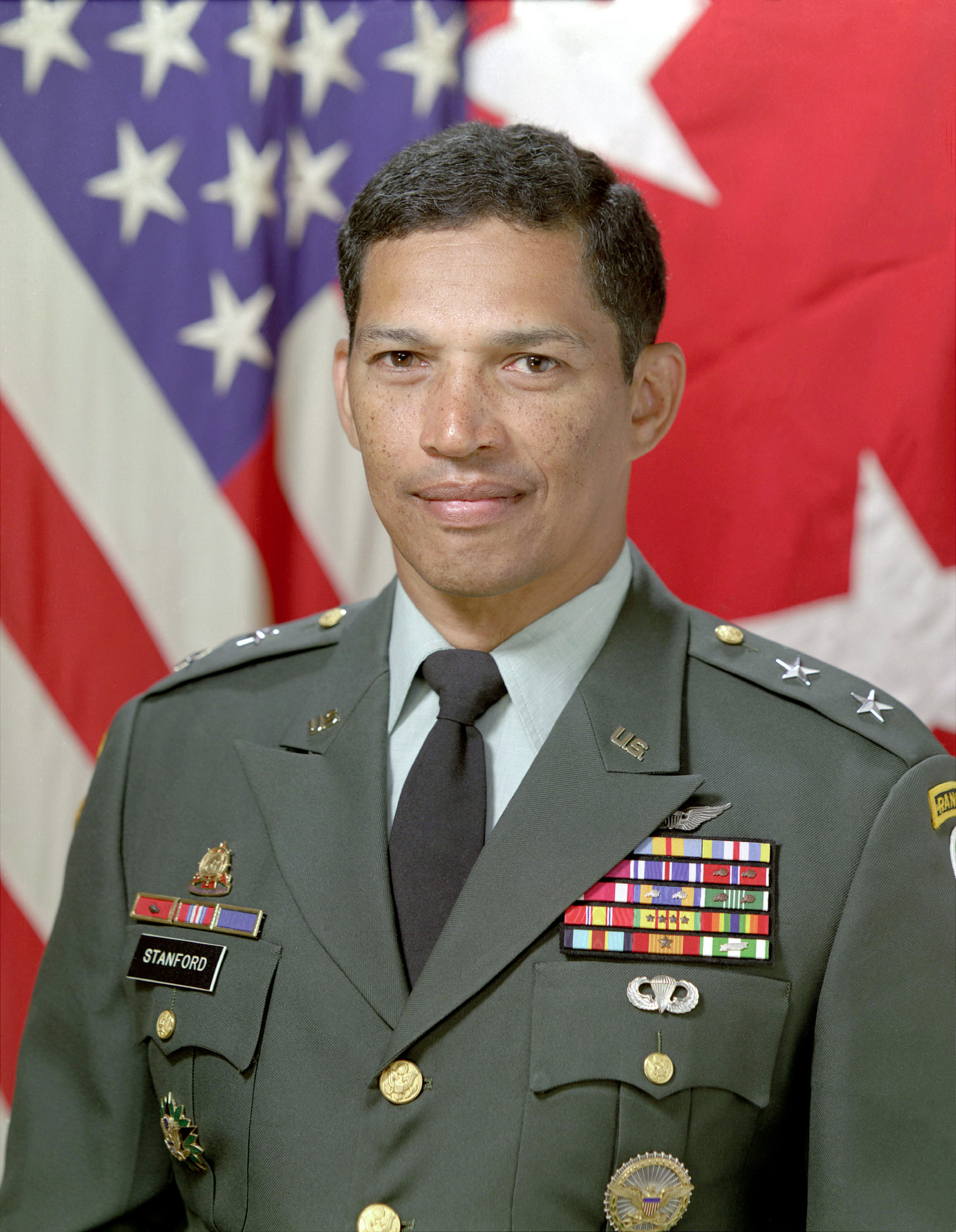
- Stanford as a Major General in 1987
- Born: John Henry Stanford; September 14, 1938; Darby, Pennsylvania, U.S.
- Died: November 28, 1998 (aged 60); Seattle, Washington, U.S.
- Burial place: Arlington National Cemetery
- Alma mater: Penn State, B.A., 1961
- Spouse: Patricia
- Children: 2 sons
- Military career
- Allegiance: United States of America
- Branch: United States Army
- Service years: 1961–1991
- Rank: Major General
- Other work: Fulton County Executive, Superintendent of Seattle Public Schools

John Henry Stanford (September 14, 1938 – November 28, 1998) was a United States Army major general who later became superintendent of public schools in Seattle.

== Early life and education ==
Born in Darby, Pennsylvania, a suburb of Philadelphia, Stanford graduated from Yeadon High School and Pennsylvania State University, earning a B.A. in political science. In 1975, he received a master's degree in personnel management and administration from Central Michigan University.

== Military service ==
Stanford entered the U.S. Army in 1961 after college and rose to the rank of major general (O-8). He served during the Vietnam War and Operation Desert Storm and also worked as executive assistant to Secretary of Defense Caspar Weinberger. Trained as an infantry officer and fixed-wing aviator, Stanford was awarded the Distinguished Flying Cross and several Air Medals.

== Fulton County Executive ==
In 1991, Stanford was hired as executive of Fulton County, Georgia. As county executive in Atlanta, he earned praise from civic leaders, though progress on his agenda of cutting bureaucracy and waste in county government was often impeded by infighting among members of the county commission.

== Seattle Schools Superintendent ==
Without a background in educational administration, he was recruited in 1995 for the post of superintendent of the Seattle Public Schools, becoming the school district's first African-American administrator. Stanford believed the school system exhibited the lethargic characteristics of a monopoly and said it had "an inward kind of thinking that is more concerned about the comfort of the people who run the system than the public it is supposed to serve." Arriving in Seattle, Stanford reassigned one-third of the district's principals. He announced that poor customer service by staff would be punishable by firing, students who did not meet minimum academic requirements would be prevented from advancing to the next grade level, and that future school construction would be "on cost and on time." He also moved to end desegregation busing.

Stanford was seen as a charismatic, popular leader, and - in his first year on the job - was credited with helping to raise more than $2 million in private donations to support district initiatives. Dropout rates in Seattle schools declined and SAT scores rose during his tenure. The Seattle school board reported that Stanford had met all ten of the goals they had established on his hiring. Some teachers, however, criticized Stanford's emphasis on standardized testing and he was forced to back down from an initiative to allow corporate sponsorships of extracurricular programs in the face of parent opposition. Several of Stanford's proposals, such as introducing school uniforms and restricting the issuance of driver's licenses to students known to affiliate with gangs, never gained traction.

In 1996, Stanford addressed the Democratic National Convention.

== Death ==
Stanford announced he had leukemia in April 1998; he was treated at Swedish Medical Center by physicians from the Fred Hutchinson Cancer Research Center, and died seven months later at age sixty.

== Legacy ==
Stanford's death was announced on the front page of The Seattle Times, which the newspaper later made available in commemorative poster form. A memorial service held at the University of Washington's Hec Edmundson Pavilion was attended by 2,500; he was buried with military honors at Arlington National Cemetery the next day, in a ceremony attended by Colin Powell and Richard Riley.

The Seattle school district headquarters facility, the John Stanford Center for Educational Excellence, was renamed after Stanford, and the Seattle school district's Latona School was renamed John Stanford International School.

Following Stanford's death, a Stanford Endowment was established to fund teacher training and leadership programs, receiving an early donation of $2 million from the Bill & Melinda Gates Foundation.

Stanford's book, Victory in Our Schools: We Can Give Our Children Excellent Public Education, was published the year after his death. In it, he argues for schools to be run like businesses, based on performance. The foreword of the book was contributed by Al Gore.
