= Martha Schofield =

American abolitionist and educator (1839–1916)

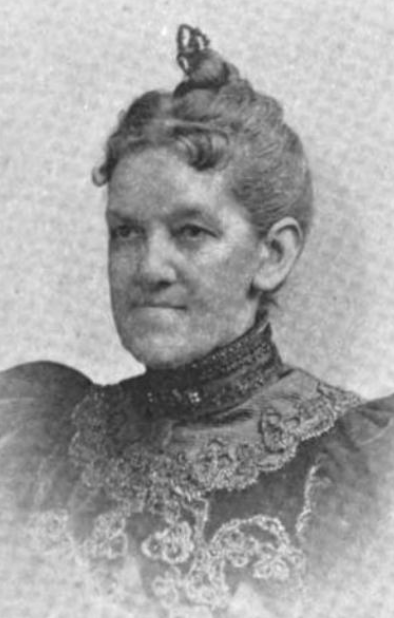
- Martha Schofield, from an 1895 publication
- Born: Martha Fell Schofield; February 1, 1839; Newtown Township, Bucks County, Pennsylvania, U.S.
- Died: February 1, 1916 (aged 77); Aiken, South Carolina
- Occupations: teacher, abolitionist, suffragist
- Known for: Schofield Normal and Industrial School
- Parents: Oliver W. Schofield (father); Mary (Jackson) Schofield (mother)
- Family: Sarah Jane (sister); Lydia (sister); Benjamin (brother); Eliza (sister)

Martha Schofield (February 1, 1839 – February 1, 1916) was a Hicksite Quaker abolitionist and suffragist who founded Schofield Normal and Industrial School in Aiken, South Carolina for freed African Americans in Aiken, South Carolina.

== Biography ==
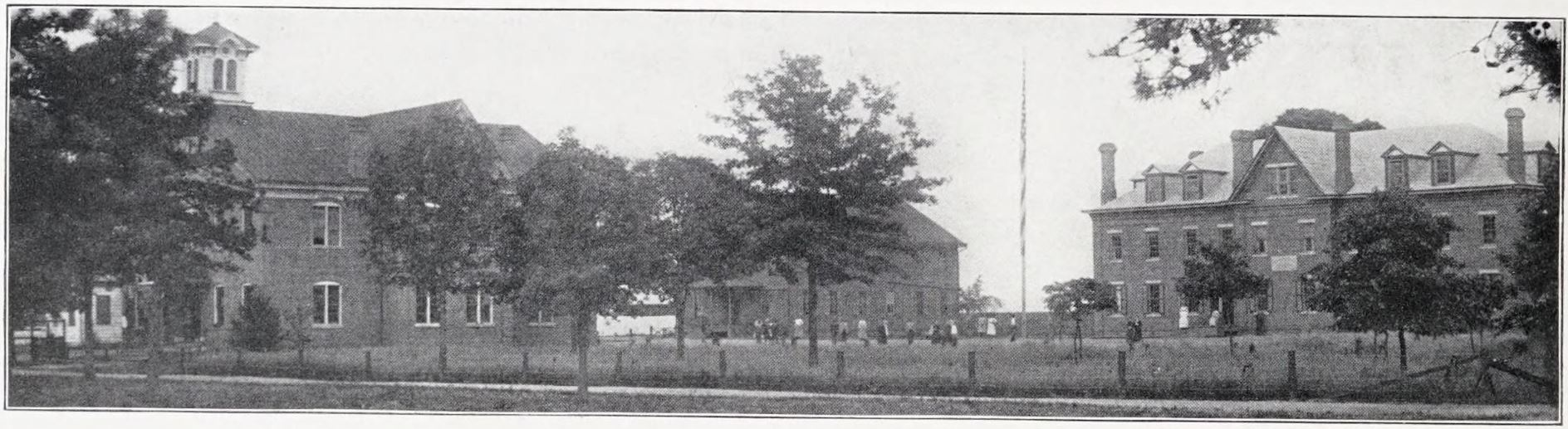
Schofield Normal and Industrial School in Aiken, South Carolina (Deborah F. Wharton Industrial Hall on the right, named for Deborah Fisher Wharton)

Martha Fell Schofield was born February 1, 1839, near Newtown Township, Bucks County, Pennsylvania, to Oliver W. Schofield and Mary (Jackson) Schofield. The family included four sisters and one brother. Her parents were Quaker and reformers. They worked for abolition, temperance, women's rights, and education. After the death of her father, the Schofields moved to Darby, PA, where her parents were married (Darby Meeting Records 1834) and her mother had grown up. (Martha Schofield's diaries 1858, Friends Historical Library; Swarthmore, PA).

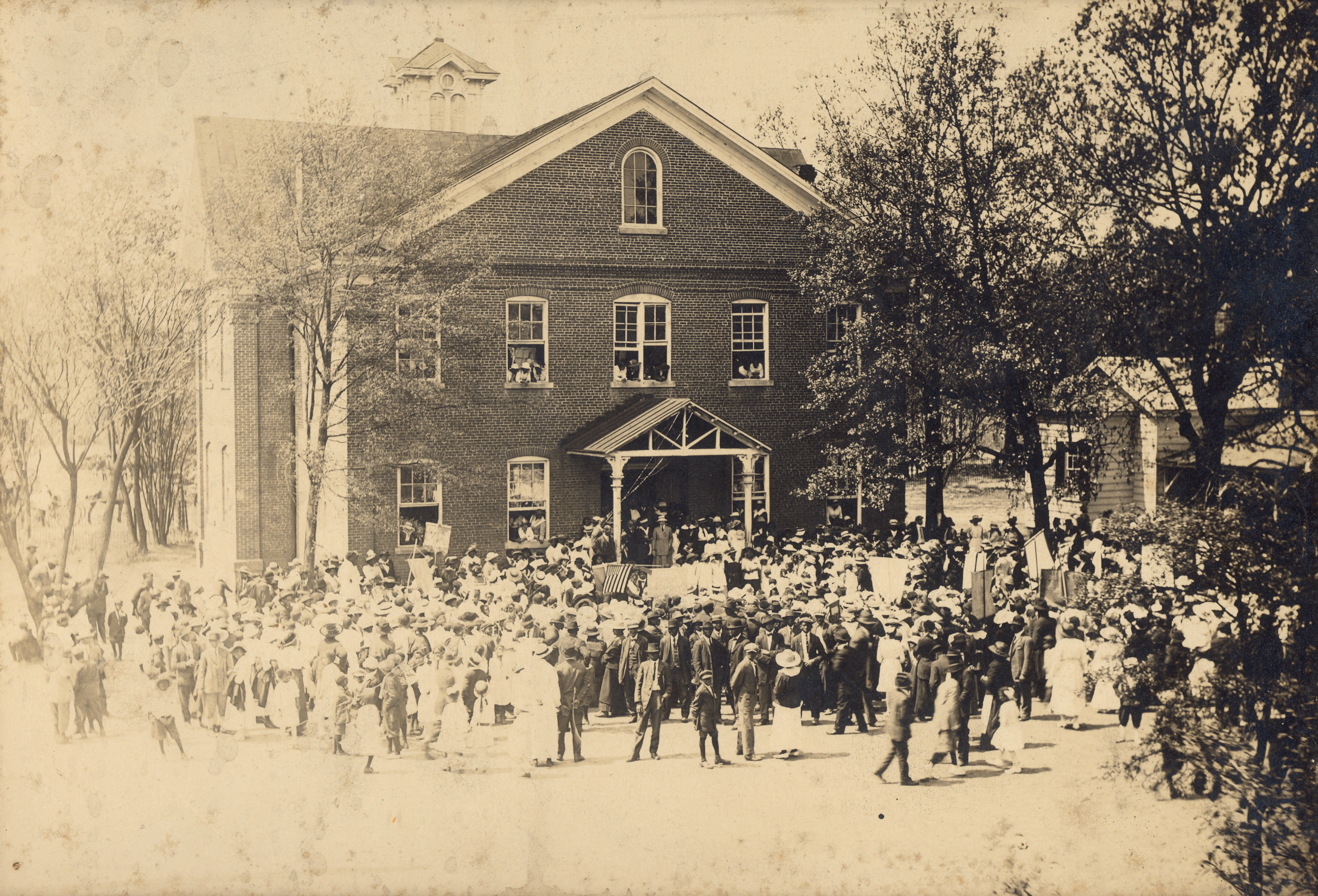
Students and teachers outside the Schofield Normal and Industrial School

Schofield received her education initially through the local school in Newtown. Later, she attended a school in Byberry, Philadelphia before going to the Sharon Female Seminary in Darby, now Sharon Hill, Pennsylvania. Her uncle and aunt, John and Rachel Tyson Jackson operated this seminary.

Portrait of Young Martha Schofield

When she was finished at school Schofield became a teacher, beginning in Bayside, Long Island. Her mother's sister Eliza Bell lived there. Schofield also taught in Harrison, Westchester County, New York, at a school affiliated with the Purchase Monthly Meeting. During the Civil War, Schofield worked in the Summit House military hospital though forbidden to nurse and so she ended up fundraising. Afterwards she moved to Wadmalaw Island, Edisto, St Helena and Johns Island, off South Carolina where there was a group of newly freed people in 1865. Unfortunately, the malaria conditions on the islands caused her health to suffer, so she moved full time to Aiken, South Carolina. Schofield then founded a school in 1868, which went on to be known as the Schofield Normal and Industrial School. The school was run by Elizabeth Dorsey and Sarah Fisher Corlies, the sister of Deborah F. Wharton. While the Schofield Normal and Industrial School received some support from the state it was also partially funded by the Pennsylvania Friends Relief Association, which had headquarters in Germantown, PA. When the school reached 200 students in 1882 it was incorporated. As the need for financial aid increased, the school received additional funding from members of the Hicksite Quakers, specifically those from the Philadelphia and New York Yearly Meetings. The school continued to grow, doubling to 400 students by 1883, at which point the curriculum included the opportunity for students to learn a trade, in addition to their academics. Schofield spent considerable time every year fundraising. By 1884 the school included a boarding facility and offered student aid. The construction of the Deborah F. Wharton Industrial Hall was completed in 1890, funded by a donation in memory of Deborah F. Wharton by her sons. By 1910, the school had grown to include two town blocks, featuring three large brick buildings and two large frame buildings, as well as a separate 280-acre farm. Funding predominately came from annual subscriptions. All departments heads and teachers were black graduates of the Schofield Normal and Industrial School, with the exception being the headmaster or headmistress, and the founder, Martha Schofield.

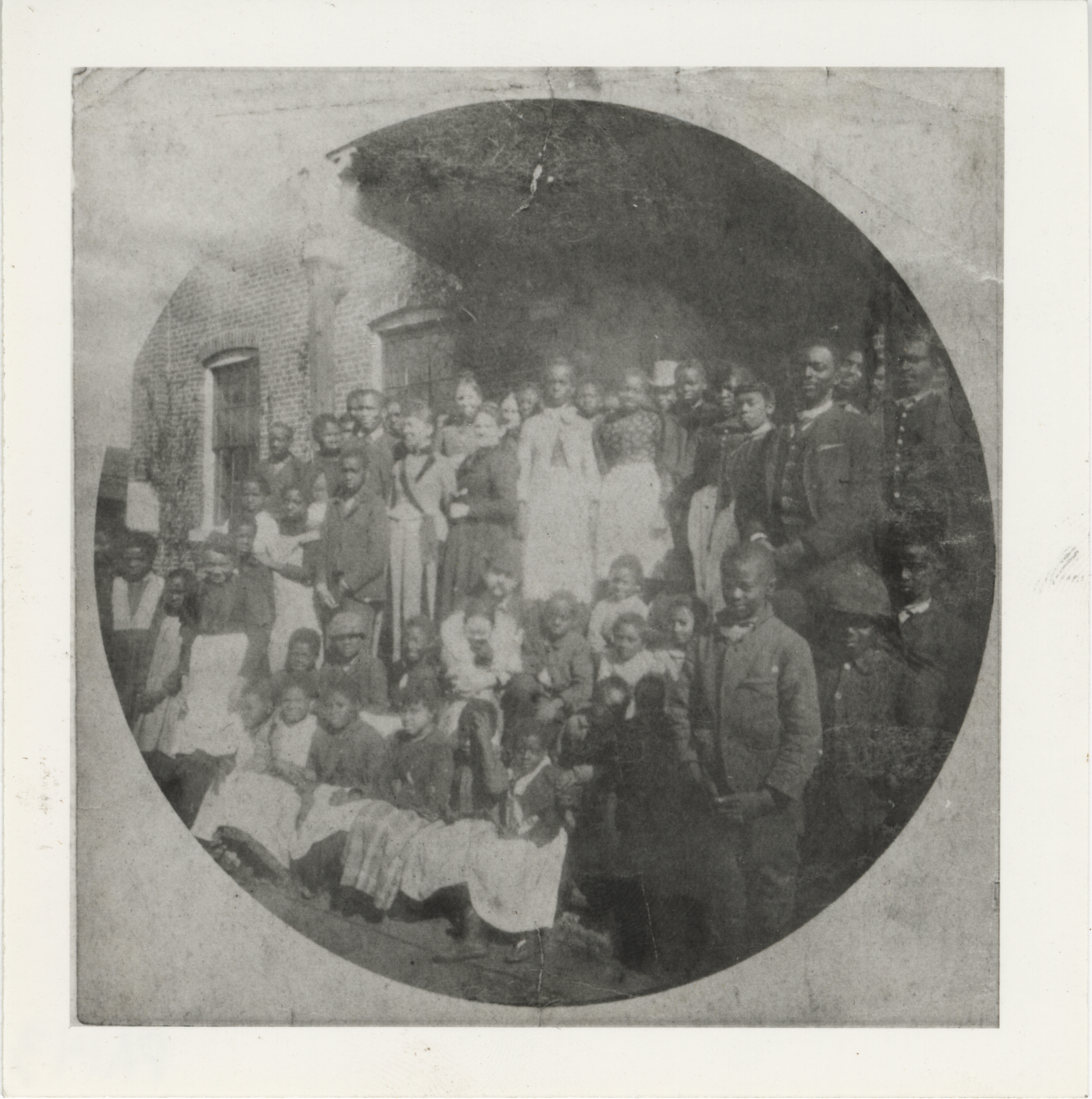
Students of the Schofield Normal and Industrial School

Schofield was a reformer in education but also a feminist and suffragist. She died the night before her 77th birthday, on February 1, 1916, in Aiken. She was buried in Darby, Pennsylvania, at the Darby Friends Burial Ground. Her school became the Martha Schofield High School in 1952. This was the high school for Black students under segregation. White students attended Aiken High School. The Aiken Public School District chose to phase-in desegregation rather than follow Brown vs. Board of Education in 1964. In the 1970-1971 school year, Martha Schofield High School desegregated and became the Schofield Campus of Aiken High School with 9th and 10th grade classes. 11th and 12th grade classes with black and white students attended Aiken High School. The Schofield Campus later became Schofield Middle School in the early-1980's. The Martha Schofield Scholarship was first awarded to deserving African-American students in 1954.
