= Darby 1919 lynching attempt =

Attempted killing of an African-American boy in Darby, Pennsylvania, U.S.

- Part of Red Summer
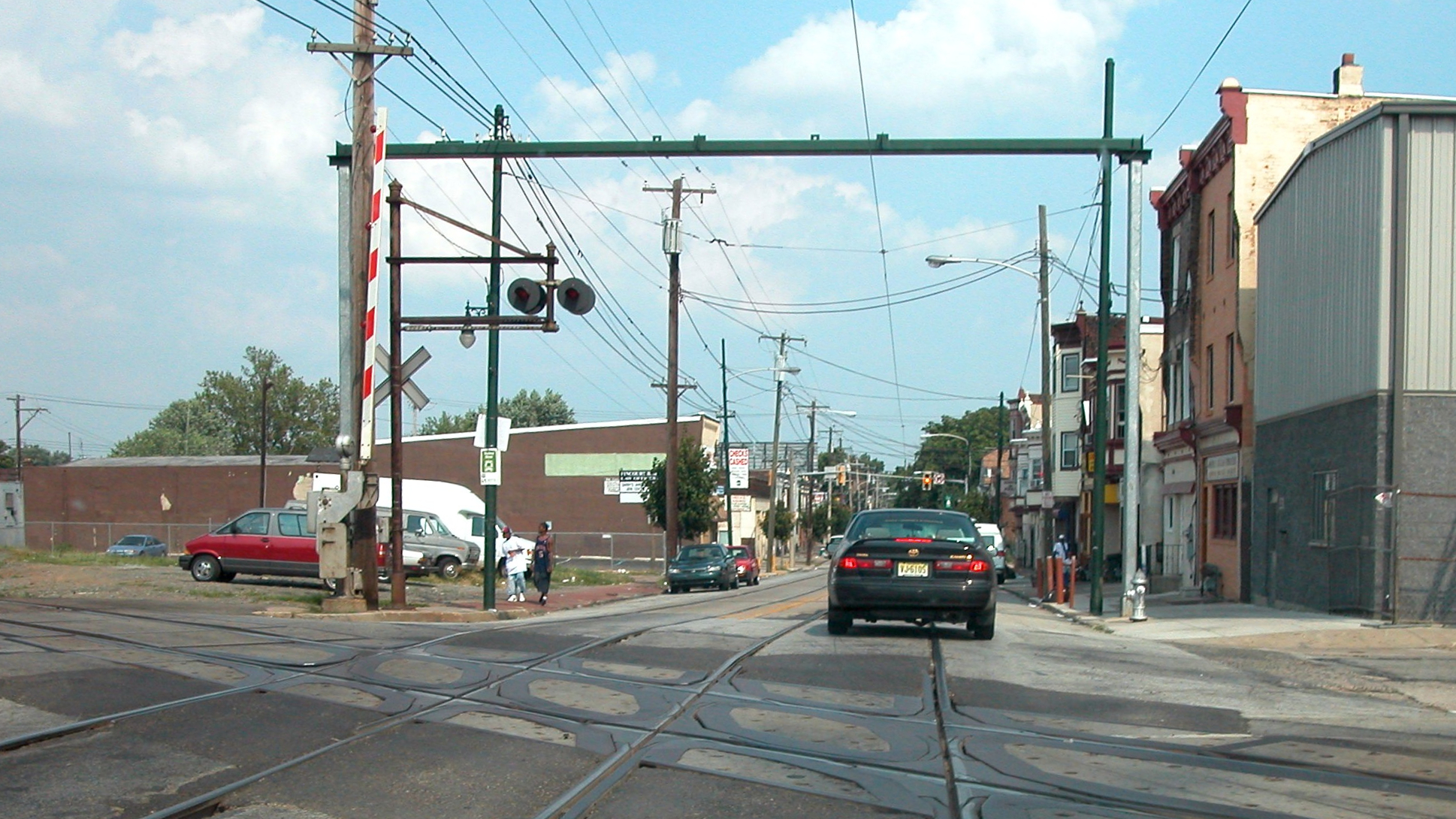
- William E. Taylor owned the hay shop on 503 Main Street (pictured)
- Date: July 23, 1919
- Location: Darby, Pennsylvania, U.S.

The Darby 1919 lynching attempt was the attempted lynching of Samuel Gorman (Note: Some of the sources spell his name as "Dorman") in Darby, Pennsylvania on July 23, 1919. Samuel Gorman, a 17-year-old black boy was sent to jail for the alleged murder of William E. Taylor.

== Attempted lynching ==
Samuel Gorman, a 17-year-old African-American worked for hay merchant William E. Taylor who owned the shop on 503 Main Street. On July 23, 1919, Taylor told him that he did not have any more work for Gorman and he allegedly hit him over his head, fatally wounding him. Gorman was quickly apprehended by Chief of Police Clark. Word got out that the suspect had been arrested and a white mob quickly surrounded the jail. The police were called out en masse to prevent the mob from storming the building.

== Aftermath ==
This uprising was one of several incidents of civil unrest that began in the so-called American Red Summer, of 1919. The Summer consisted of terrorist attacks on black communities, and white oppression in over three dozen cities and counties. In most cases, white mobs attacked African American neighborhoods. In some cases, black community groups resisted the attacks, especially in Chicago and Washington, D.C. Most deaths occurred in rural areas during events like the Elaine massacre in Arkansas, where an estimated 100 to 240 black people and 5 white people were killed. Also occurring in 1919 were the Chicago Race Riot and Washington D.C. race riot which killed 38 and 39 people respectively, and with both having many more non-fatal injuries and extensive property damage reaching up into the millions of dollars.

== See also ==
- Washington race riot of 1919
- Mass racial violence in the United States
- List of incidents of civil unrest in the United States

== Bibliography ==
Notes

References

- Alexandria Gazette (July 23, 1919). "Merchant Slained [sic]: Seventeen-Year-Old Negro Held With Out Bail After Making Confession". Alexandria Gazette. Alexandria, Virginia: Edgar Snowden. p. 1, col. 6. ISSN 1946-6153. OCLC 11539504.
- Alexandria Gazette (July 24, 1919a). "Negro Boy Held: Race Feeling Runs High After Storekeepers Killing; Prisoner Soon Caught". Alexandria Gazette. Alexandria, Virginia: Edgar Snowden. pp. 1–6. ISSN 1946-6153. OCLC 11539504.
- The Greenville News (July 23, 1919). "Race classh threatened to break out early today at Darby, Pennsylvania". The Greenville News. Greenville, North Carolina. Archived from the original on October 27, 2014. Alt URL
- The New York Times (October 5, 1919). "For Action on Race Riot Peril". The New York Times. New York, NY. ISSN 1553-8095. OCLC 1645522.
- The Sun (July 23, 1919). "Murder by Negro stirs race feeling". The Sun. New York, NY: Sun Print. and Pub. Co. pp. 1–20. ISSN 2166-1820. OCLC 9517450.
- Voogd, Jan (2008). Race Riots and Resistance: The Red Summer of 1919. Peter Lang. ISBN 9781433100673. - Total pages: 234
