= Curtis Park station =

Railway station in Sharon Hill, Pennsylvania

Curtis Park
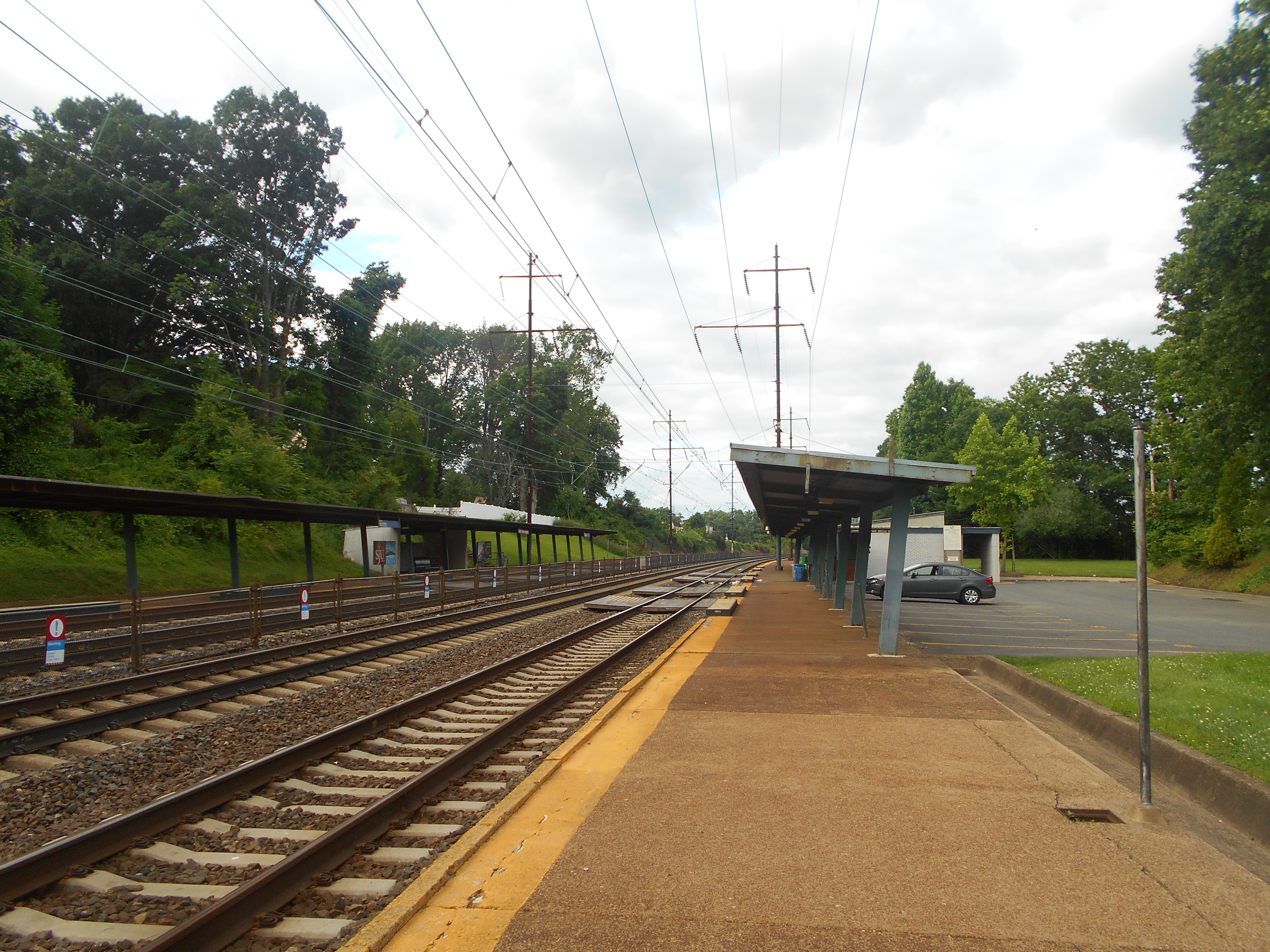
- Curtis Park station platform in June 2014

General information
- Location: 400 Oak Avenue; Sharon Hill, Pennsylvania, U.S.
- Coordinates: 39°54′29″N 75°15′54″W
- Owner: SEPTA
- Line: Amtrak Northeast Corridor
- Platforms: 2 side platforms
- Tracks: 4
- Connections: SEPTA Suburban Bus: 115

Construction
- Parking: 24 spaces
- Accessible: No

Other information
- Fare zone: 2

History
- Opened: March 7, 1949
- Electrified: 1928
- Former names: Academy

Services
Preceding station	SEPTA	Following station
Sharon Hill toward Newark	Wilmington/Newark Line	Darby toward Temple University
Former services
Preceding station	Pennsylvania Railroad	Following station
Sharon Hill toward Wilmington	Wilmington Line	Darby toward Suburban Station
Location

Curtis Park is an active commuter railroad station in the borough of Sharon Hill, Delaware County, Pennsylvania. Located at the ends of Oak Avenue in Sharon Hill, the station serves trains of SEPTA Regional Rail's Wilmington/Newark Line from Center City, Philadelphia to Wilmington and Newark, Delaware. Amtrak inter-city rail services along the Northeast Corridor bypass the station. Curtis Park station contains two low-level side platforms and a standing but closed railroad depot on the northbound platform. It also contains a 24-space parking lot for commuters.

Curtis Park station opened on March 7, 1949, replacing the former Academy station, which was built in the autumn of 1877 to serve the Holy Child Academy and Convent. Academy station was an underused side platform station with a shelter shed installed in October 1935 that had limited service. With the opening of a new plant of Curtis Publishing Company in 1948 for its The Saturday Evening Post production, the Pennsylvania Railroad announced construction of a new station to facilitate services with the new plant. Construction began in May 1948 on the new $250,000 station.

== History ==
Construction began on March 18, 1946 for a new plant in Sharon Hill for the Curtis Publishing Company, a firm known for the production of the Saturday Evening Post. A groundbreaking ceremony had been held two days prior with officials from the county, the borough of Sharon Hill, the Delaware County Chamber of Commerce and officials from Curtis Publishing. This new plant on Elmwood Avenue, being built on $167,000 of purchased land next to the Pennsylvania Railroad, would cost $15 million to build. Considered a boon for local property and school taxes, the new plant's main building would be 375 by 1,200 feet (114 m × 366 m) and two stories tall. This building would involve facilities for the design, printing, binding and shipping for the company's print magazines. The 100-acre (40 ha) site would contain parking to fit a future employment of 5,000 people. With the new plant next to the railroad, it would involve using 50–100 freight cars daily for its operations. An official from the railroad stated that they would install freight spurs next to the right-of-way for the plant and at the end, eight tracks would operate into the facility. They also added that it was a possibility a new railroad station would be built with its own freight agent to handle the high load of operations.

On August 1, 1946, a hearing would be held in Sharon Hill for its zoning committee on the construction of a new freight station on Chester Pike (U.S. Route 13) near Calcon Hook Road by the Baltimore and Ohio Railroad. This would also include construction of a new freight yard. The railroad spent over $50,000 on property for the new freight station to service the Curtis plant, but all of the land was zoned residential at that point. The choice of location was based on the fact that both railroads (Pennsylvania and Baltimore and Ohio) could reach the facility and make it easier for Curtis staff to reach. The Pennsylvania Railroad had already finished its new spur into the future Curtis plant.

The hearing was a controversial affair. After filing well-signed petitions, local residents packed the meeting, only the second for the new Sharon Hill Zoning Commission, stating that they opposed the change from residential to industrial. Officials from Curtis Publishing and the Baltimore and Ohio Railroad at the hearing reiterated that their location choice was because of the accessibility to other railroad lines and that over 100 locations had been previously considered for the new freight yard and station. The Sharon Hill Zoning Commission stated that it opposed to the change to industrial, stating that this new freight terminal for Curtis could just become a general freight terminal and that they would put their recommendation to the Borough Council on August 6.

Recognizing the widespread opposition to the proposal, officials of Curtis Publishing and the Baltimore and Ohio Railroad announced that they would abandon plans for a freight station and yard on August 26 at a Borough Council hearing. Ronald Bonsall, an attorney for the publisher, stated that they would not continue to press for permits and a change of zoning. W. Charles Hogg, an attorney for the railroad, stated that efforts were underway to find a new location for the freight station, but that it would be outside of Sharon Hill. Hogg, however, continued to press for the re-zoning efforts from residential to industrial for the stretch on Chester Pike near Calcon Hook Road. He conceded that if changes were made to local zoning ordinances, the railroad would not pursue further action.

With the opening of the plant approaching, the Pennsylvania Railroad announced on May 18, 1948 that they would construct a new railroad station in the area of the plant. With the expectation that the plant would now employ around 7,000 people, the Pennsylvania Railroad would see at least half of the workers commute by train to reach the facility. Following formal approval from the Pennsylvania Public Utility Commission in Harrisburg, the new station would built just east of the existing Academy station and the Calcon Hook Road bridge. This new station would cost $250,000 and replace Academy station, which would close upon opening of the new station, christened "Curtis Park". The new Curtis Park station would include 600-foot (180 m) long side platforms and a canopy along 300 feet (91 m) of each platform. A new station depot made of steel and brick would be built at Curtis Park. The waiting room would be a 19-by-42-foot (5.8 m × 12.8 m) area, alongside a 16-by-9-foot (4.9 m × 2.7 m) baggage room and a 13-by-12-foot (4.0 m × 3.7 m) ticket office for the new agent. Stairways from Calcon Hook Road would also be constructed to reach the platforms and a pedestrian tunnel would be built under the four track main line to reach either side of the station. An expanded parking area would also be made available. With contracts awarded by the railroad, the expectation was that construction would begin within ten days of the announcement.

The new Curtis plant opened the next week with limited operations thanks with the completed construction of the main plant and power plant. The expectation was that all production of The Saturday Evening Post would be moved into the new Sharon Hill plant.

The railroad announced that the new station would open at 8:00 a.m. on March 7, 1949 with a train to Center City, Philadelphia. As part of the announcement, the railroad stated that the new station would have 43 trains daily, 20 northbound towards Philadelphia and 23 southbound to Wilmington, Delaware. This was in stark contrast to the Academy station, which only had a few trains stop to help serve the Holy Child Academy and Convent. Workmen from the Pennsylvania Railroad removed the shelter shed that served as the Academy station by March 5. and the plans were to remove the side platforms that served commuters. The new station depot would open as well with the new ticket agent being the one who formerly served at Marcus Hook on the same line. A new timetable would also become official on March 7 at 2:00 a.m. to reflect the new station. The expectation was that E.W. Smith, the vice president of the Pennsylvania Railroad's eastern region would attend, along with R.M. Gutshall, the supervising agent for the Baltimore Division. Officials for Curtis Publishing were also expected and Sharon Hill police would help with the opening ceremonies due to the high amount of expected traffic.

Despite the pomp and circumstance, the rush to the new Curtis Park station did not occur. Only 15 tickets were sold at Curtis Park station within a half-hour of opening. The first customer arrived at the ticket office at 7:55 a.m. and purchased a 25-pack commutation ticket from Philadelphia and Sharon Hill.

Curtis Publishing Company announced on July 2, 1969 that they would close the Sharon Hill plant in favor of operations in Detroit, Michigan, Canton, Ohio and Wisconsin. The expectation was that the plant would close on July 14 and that offers to purchase the plant were considered but were not accepted.

== Station layout ==
Curtis Park has two low-level side platforms with walkways connecting passengers to the inner tracks. Amtrak's Northeast Corridor lines bypass the station via the center tracks.
