= Folcroft station =

SEPTA station

Folcroft
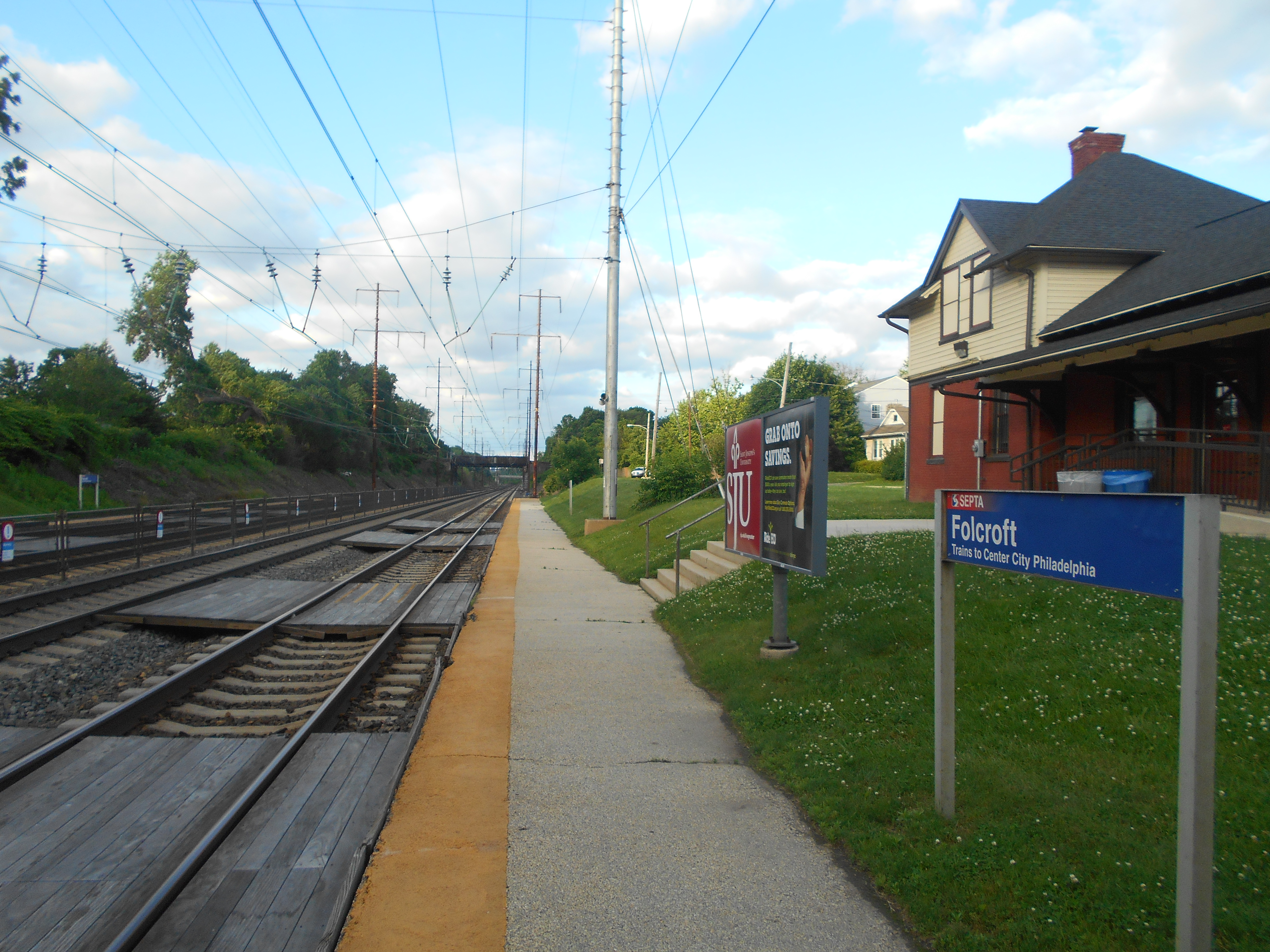
- Folcroft station platform in June 2014.

General information
- Location: 1555 Baltimore Avenue; Folcroft, Pennsylvania, U.S.
- Coordinates: 39°54′02″N 75°16′46″W
- Owner: SEPTA
- Line: Amtrak Northeast Corridor
- Platforms: 2 side platforms
- Tracks: 4
- Connections: SEPTA Suburban Bus: 115

Construction
- Parking: 42 spaces
- Cycle facilities: 2 rack spaces
- Accessible: No

Other information
- Fare zone: 2

History
- Electrified: 1928

Services
Preceding station	SEPTA	Following station
Glenolden toward Newark	Wilmington/Newark Line	Sharon Hill toward Temple University
Former services
Preceding station	Pennsylvania Railroad	Following station
Glenolden toward Wilmington	Wilmington Line	Sharon Hill toward Suburban Station
Location

Folcroft station is a SEPTA train station on the Wilmington/Newark Line in Pennsylvania. The line offers southbound service to Wilmington and Newark, Delaware and northbound service to Philadelphia. Located at Primos and Elmwood Avenues in Folcroft, the station has a 43-space parking lot.

On May 28, 2009, SEPTA approved a $2.6 million rehabilitation effort which will include Folcroft station.

== Station layout ==
Folcroft has two low-level side platforms with walkways connecting passengers to the inner tracks. Amtrak's Northeast Corridor lines bypass the station via the inner tracks.
