= Schofield Normal and Industrial School =

Coordinates: 33.5611°N 81.7110°W

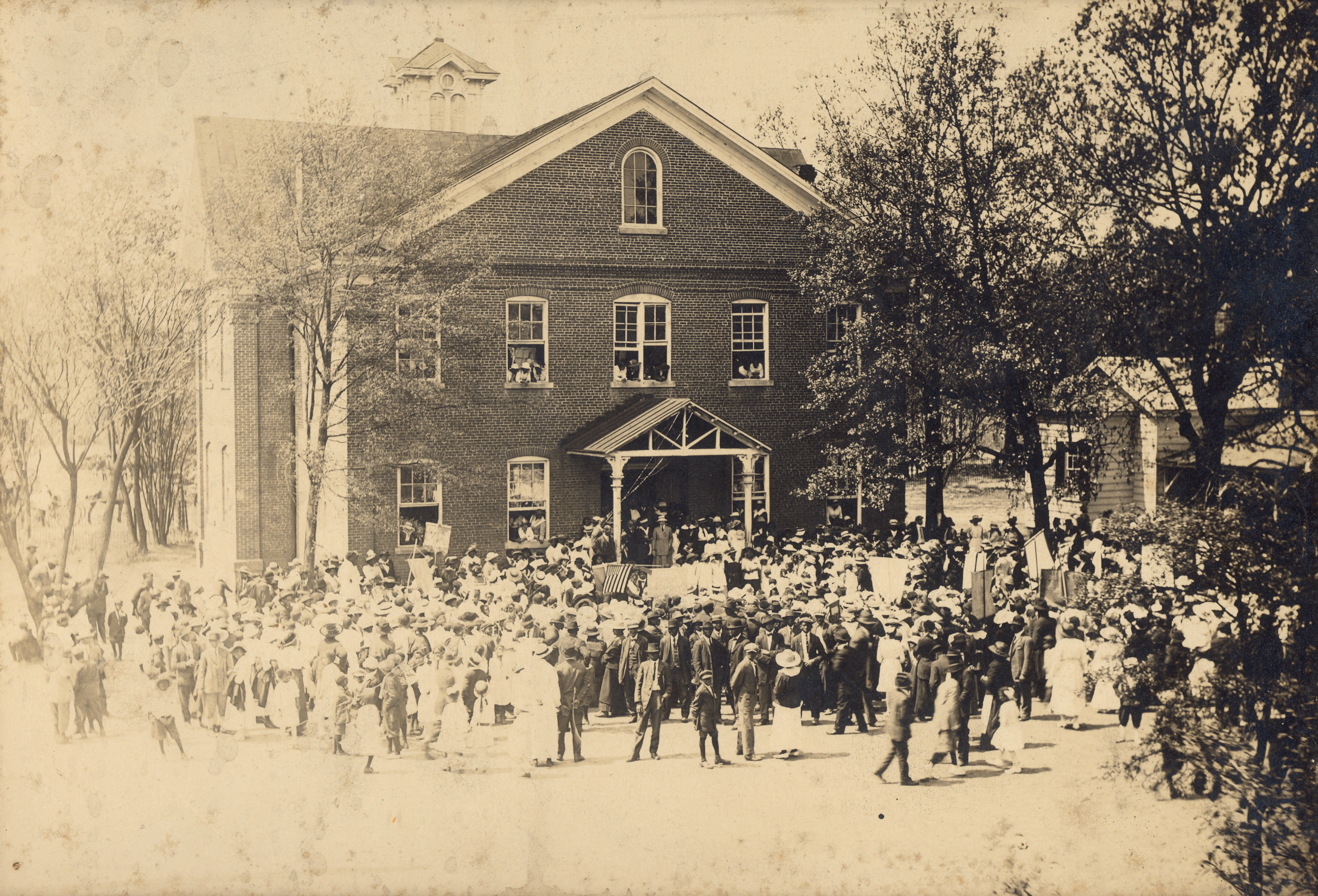
Students and teachers outside the Schofield Normal and Industrial School in 1900

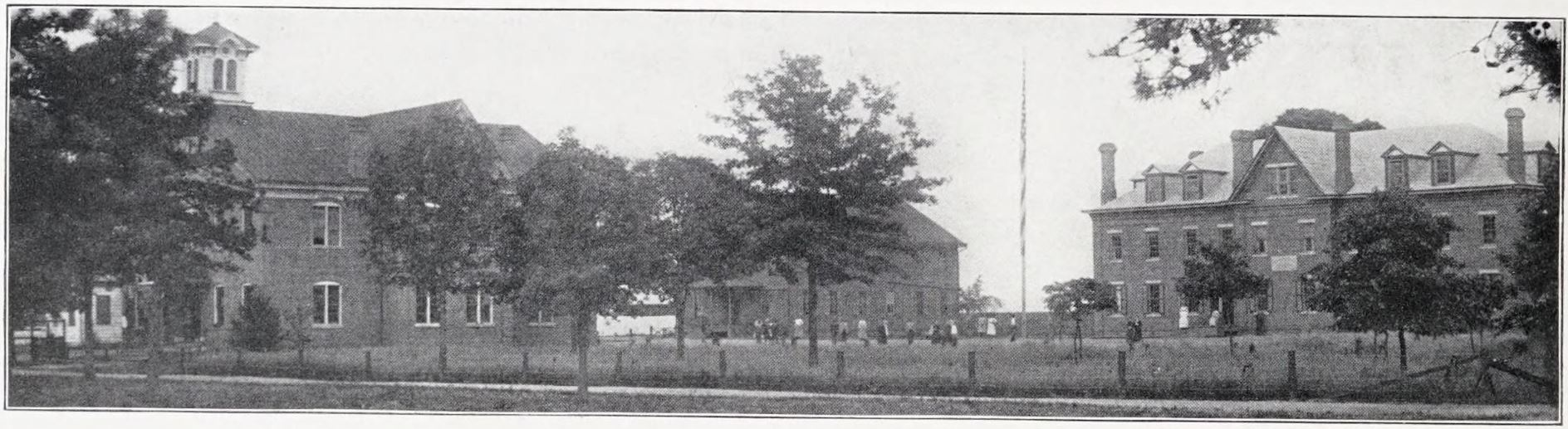
Schofield Normal and Industrial School in Aiken, South Carolina (Deborah F. Wharton Industrial Hall on the right, named for Deborah Fisher Wharton)

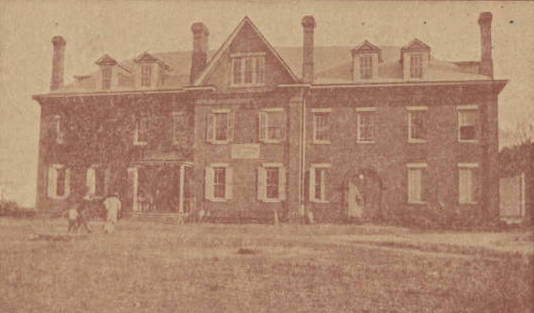
Wharton Hall at Schofield Normal and Industrial School in 1909

Schofield Normal and Industrial School was a school for African Americans in Aiken, South Carolina. It is now a public middle school. It is part of the Reconstruction Era National Historic Network of Reconstruction Era history. Alumni include Matilda Evans who became the first female African American doctor licensed in South Carolina. It became the public Martha Schofield High School before integration and later a middle school that remains open was also named for Martha Schofield.

The school was founded by the Freedmen's Bureau in 1866. Martha Schofield, a Quaker from Pennsylvania became its superintendent. It became a boarding school and taught trades and trained teachers. It was merged into the public school system in 1952. It was integrated in the 1960s and became a middle school.

Isaac Fisher taught at the school. Nick Aaron Ford taught at the school.

Martha Schofield was also a political activist. She wrote to her sister on school stationery.

Sanford P. Brady, an alumnus of the school, became its first African American superintendent. A belltower from the school that topped its Carter Hall is extant. A historical marker commemorates the school's history. Friends Historical Library of Swarthmore College has a collection of papers from the school. The school is part of the Reconstruction Era National Historic Network.

== Schofield Middle School ==
Schofield Middle School is a public school in Aiken. It is on Sumter Street. As of 2021, more than half the student body is African American.
