= Murder of Terry Bowers Jr. =

1970 unsolved child murder in Pennsylvania

Terrence J. Bowers Jr. (Nov 23, 1958 – April 26, 1970) was an American child who was murdered on the grounds of St. Basil The Great Roman Catholic Church in Kimberton, Chester County, PA while camping with his Boy Scout Troop in 1970. The case remains unsolved with no motive ever established.

== Case history ==
On April 24, 1970, Boy Scout Troop 275 from Blessed Virgin Mary Roman Catholic Church in Darby, Delaware County, Pennsylvania left about 7pm and drove approximately 30 miles north to St. Basil the Great Parish. The Catholic church sat on 18-acres of land on Kimberton Road and route 113 in Kimberton, PA. The troop had been granted permission to camp at St. Basil's by the pastor at the time, William H. Finigan.

The group consisted of twenty-four scouts and six adult leaders. The scouts set up their camp in an open area about 200 yards from the church. A scout official reported that on April 25, 1970, the boy scouts had an active day playing football and field hockey. That evening, many of the scouts slept in the tents, while Bowers and six other boys slept around the fire in their sleeping bags.

Bowers was last seen alive by a scouting official near the campfire at 2am.

=== Discovery of the body ===
On April 26, 1970, the sun rose at 6:09am. Bowers was found face down and half out of his sleeping bag by fellow camper around 7:30am on April 26, 1970. He was soaked with blood and unclothed from the waist down. He was taken to Phoenixville Hospital by ambulance where he was pronounced dead.

=== Autopsy ===
The autopsy was performed by Chester County coroner, Donald E. Harrop. It was concluded that Bowers was stabbed a total of four times through his sleeping bag. He sustained three stab wounds to his back, and one stab would that went through his right arm and entered his chest. The attack was concluded to be sometime between 2am and 7:30am on April 26, 1970. The weapon, while never found, was thought to be a 4.5" one-edged knife. Harrop concluded that there was no evidence of sexual assault, although attempted sexual assault was not able to be ruled out by state investigators. Harrop estimated the time of death to be around 6:30am, about one hour before he was found. Daylight savings in 1970 occurred on April 26.

=== Investigation ===
The initial investigation was led by Sgt. James Wenner of the Pennsylvania State Police with assistance provided by both Chester County detectives and East Pikeland Township police. In the year after the murder, 26 state troopers spent over 6,000 hours on the case. However, Pennsylvania state police later admitted that not all leads were followed up due to lack of time and manpower.

All of the leaders and fellow boy scouts on the trip were questioned and all voluntarily submitted to polygraphs.All knives that the boy scouts and leaders were carrying were taken to the state crime lab for forensic testing and determined not to be the murder weapon. Kimberton Fire Company, which was located nearby, drained a pond on church property in search of the murder weapon, but it was never found.

Pennsylvania State Police checked cars in the area for several months following the murder.Police also questioned people from both Pennhurst State School and Hospital in nearby Spring City, PA and Valley Forge General Hospital. A hotline for tips was set up but produced no leads. In 1977, Finigan was reassigned to St. Joan of Arc Church in Philadelphia.

=== Theories and suspects ===
In June 1970, the Pennsylvania State Police confirmed that two men were witnessed walking away from the campsite just before Bowers was found stabbed in his sleeping bag on Sunday morning. The same witness saw a dark-colored car parked nearby.

In 1971, a Phoenixville man named Lawrence Wakely admitted to Bowers's murder. Wakely had been arrested in Phoenixville for rape and during that investigation had confessed to Bowers's murder. He was a former boy scout from Troop 105 and Troop 61, both of which were sponsored by Pennhurst State School and Hospital. Wenner had reviewed the historical records of both troops in the process of his investigation. Wakely stated the reason for murdering Bowers was retaliation against the Boy Scouts of America for being exiled at age 20. Mr. Wakely was later imprisoned at the former State Correctional Institution-Graterford. Lawrence Wakely is included in the Boy Scouts of America "Perversion Files" as an illegible volunteer. Investigators in Bowers's case dismissed him as a credible suspect due to his mental health issues. He died in 2021 at the age of 82.

In 1972, two men were questioned in relation to the case when a raid revealed both child sexual abuse material and newspaper clippings about Bowers's murder. However, no connection was ever made.

In 1977, three girl scouts were murdered while on a camping trip in Oklahoma. This case is widely known as The Oklahoma Girl Scout murders. Due to the similarity to Bowers's case, a connection was investigated by Chester County police.

Murder of Terry Bowers Jr.
- Born: November 23, 1958
- Died: April 26, 1970 (aged 11)
- Cause of death: Stab wounds
- Body discovered: St. Basil the Great Catholic Church, Kimberton, PA
- Resting place: Holy Cross Cemetery Yeadon, PA
- Parent: Terrence Bowers Sr (father) Mary (Sugar) Bowers (mother)

In 1981, an inmate at the State Correctional Institution in Dallas, Pennsylvania told police that on the morning after the murder, he witnessed a Chester County man burning bloody clothing and that the same man claimed to be Bowers's killer. In 1990, a client of a local defense attorney spoke with the Chester County District Attorney's office and implicated the same man as Bowers's murderer.

In 1987, a friend of Terry's told Mary Bowers that he believed Terry was murdered in a case of mistaken identity. The man looked similar to Terry and his theory was that a man who wanted to silence him about past abuse had mistakenly killed Terry. It is unclear if this theory was investigated by police.

Both the Catholic Church and the Boy Scouts of America have been the subject of child sexual abuse allegations in the years following Bowers's murder. A Grand jury investigation of Catholic Church sexual abuse in Pennsylvania concluded in 2018, resulting in legislative changes in the state of Pennsylvania. The Boy Scouts of America sex abuse cases were also prevalent. Confidential files nicknamed the "perversion files" were released alleging prolific sexual abuse of scouts and cover-ups. These allegations resulted in numerous court cases and convictions, monetary compensation, and programmatic changes.

== Life and internment ==
Terrence J. Bowers was the son of Terrence J. Bowers Sr. and Mary C. "Sugar" Quigley Bowers. Bowers was the second eldest of six children. He was a sixth-grade student at Blessed Virgin Mary Grammar School in Darby, PA.

The funeral mass took place on April 29, 1970 at Blessed Virgin Mary Church in Darby, PA. The funeral mass was officiated by Francis X. Morrison. He is interred at Holy Cross cemetery.
