= Nick Aaron Ford =

American author

Nick Aaron Ford Jr.
- Born: August 4, 1904; Ridgeway, South Carolina
- Died: July 17, 1982 (aged 77); Baltimore, Maryland
- Education: Benedict College; Iowa State University
- Occupations: Academic; Author
- Employer: Morgan State College
- Relatives: Sanders Ford (maternal grandfather)

Nick Aaron Ford Jr. (August 4, 1904 – July 17, 1982) was an American writer. A native of South Carolina, he was educated at Benedict College and Iowa State University. Ford then joined the faculty of Morgan State University, eventually accepting the Alain Locke Distinguished Professorship of Black Studies. Alain Locke was a writer, historian, and philosopher.

== Life and career ==
Ford was born in Ridgeway, South Carolina, to a former slave, Nick Aaron Ford Sr., and his wife Carrie, a substitute teacher. Sanders Ford, a member of the South Carolina Senate, was the maternal grandfather of Nick Aaron Ford Jr.

Between the ages of ten and sixteen, Ford was educated at a segregated school in Winnsboro, Louisiana. He then attended a high school affiliated with Benedict College, and subsequently earned a bachelor's degree from Benedict in 1926.

Ford became principal of the Schofield Normal School in Aiken, South Carolina, until 1928, when he enrolled at Iowa State University for graduate study in journalism. Ford earned his master's degree in 1934, and his doctorate in 1945. He taught at Morgan State College from 1945 and later became Alain Locke Distinguished Professor of Black Studies in 1973. He also served as president of the College Language Association from 1961 to 1963.

He chaired Morgan State University's English Department for 23 years from 1947 to 1972. He advocated for African American studies. He married Janie Etheridge in 1927, with whom he raised a son. Ford married for the second time to Ola Scroggins Tatum in 1968.

Nick Aaron Ford Jr. died in Baltimore, Maryland, on July 17, 1982.

== Books ==
- Ford, Nick Aaron (1983). Seeking a newer world : memoirs of a Black American teacher (1st ed.). Great Neck, N.Y.: Todd & Honeywell. ISBN 0-89962-277-1. OCLC 10412401.
- Ford, Nick Aaron (1973). Black studies: threat-or-challenge. Port Washington, N.Y. ISBN 0-8046-9034-0. OCLC 702863. A signed copy of this book is in the catalogue of the National Museum of African American History and Culture.
- Ford, Nick Aaron. Cultural Integration through Literature.
- Language in uniform : a reader on propaganda. Nick A. Ford (5th ed.). Indianapolis: Odyssey Pr. 1967. ISBN 0-672-63054-0. OCLC 310463688.
- Best short stories by Afro-American writers, 1925-1950. Nick Aaron Ford, Harry Lee Faggett. Milwood, N.Y.: Kraus Reprint Co. 1977. ISBN 0-527-04930-1. OCLC 2818672.
- Extending Horizons: Selected Readings for Cultural Enrichment

== Selected publications ==
- Ford, Nick Aaron (1950). "A Blueprint for Negro Authors". Phylon. 11 (4): 374–377. doi:10.2307/272373. ISSN 0885-6818. JSTOR 272373.
- Ford, Nick Aaron (1954). "A Teacher Looks at Integration". Phylon. 15 (3): 261–266. doi:10.2307/272814. ISSN 0885-6818. JSTOR 272814.
- Ford, Nick Aaron (December 1953). "A Maryland Project in Articulation". College Composition and Communication. 4 (4): 126–128. doi:10.2307/356018. JSTOR 356018.
- Ford, Nick Aaron (1950). "Walt Whitman's Conception of Democracy". Phylon. 11 (3): 201–206. doi:10.2307/272002. ISSN 0885-6818. JSTOR 272002.
- Ford, Nick Aaron (1946). "Henry David Thoreau, Abolitionist". The New England Quarterly. 19 (3): 359–371. doi:10.2307/361971. ISSN 0028-4866. JSTOR 361971.
- Ford, Nick Aaron (2014) [Text of speech given on April 18, 1963, published posthumously]. "Language and Literature as Aids to Cultural Integration". CLA Journal. 57 (4): 255–261. ISSN 0007-8549. JSTOR 44325874.

== Legacy ==
In 1983 Morgan State University initiated the Nick Aaron Ford and Waters Edward Turpin Symposium on African-American Literature named in honor of Ford and Turpin, a collaborator of Ford's who joined him at Morgan State at Ford's request. Ford's papers including letters, book drafts and other writings are located at the University of South Carolina.
