= Sanders Ford =

American politician (c.1810–1873)

Sanders Ford (c.1810 - 1873) was a farmer and state legislator in South Carolina. He was elected to represent Fairfield County, South Carolina in the South Carolina Senate in 1872, and died in office in 1873.

Ford was born in South Carolina and enslaved. After the American Civil War he had a farm near Winnsboro. Henry Johnson contested his election. Ford was one of four African Americans to represent Fairfield County in the state senate during the Reconstruction era. His grandson Nick Aaron Ford was a black studies scholar and the first college graduate in the family.

== See also ==
- African American officeholders from the end of the Civil War until before 1900
