= Waters Edward Turpin =

American author, professor (1910–1968)

- Born: April 9, 1910; Oxford, Maryland, U.S.
- Died: November 19, 1968 (aged 58)
- Resting place: Baltimore National Cemetery
- Other name: Waters Turpin
- Education: Morgan State College, Teachers College, Columbia University
- Occupations: Professor, novelist, playwright, textbook author
- Known for: Author of African-American literary history
- Movement: Harlem Renaissance

Waters Edward Turpin (April 9, 1910 – November 19, 1968) was an American novelist, professor, playwright, and textbook author. He gained prominence during the later half of the Harlem Renaissance, and was known for his work in African-American literary history. Turpin published three novels.

== Early life and education ==
Waters Edward Turpin was born on April 9, 1910, in Oxford, Maryland. He was an only child to African American parents Simon and Mary Rebecca (née Waters) Turpin. His grandfather, Captain Jack Waters may have been the first black-owned waterman's business in Oxford. He was raised with the early oral histories dating back to slave ships. Novelist Edna Ferber employed his mother, and she had encouraged him to explore writing at a young age.

He graduated with an A.B. degree from Morgan State College (now Morgan State University); and an A.M. degree (1932) and EdD (1960) from Teachers College, Columbia University.

He was married to Jean Fisher Turpin and they had two children.

== Career ==
His early career started in 1935 as an English teacher at Storer College, but left to finish his doctorate degree. From 1940 until 1950, he taught at Lincoln University in Oxford, Pennsylvania. In 1950, he joined the English department at his alma mater Morgan State College, where his wife Jean also taught.

His book These Low Grounds (1937), is about four generations of African-Americans living in eastern Maryland. Author Richard Wright wrote a book review on These Low Grounds (1937) published in the New Masses magazine (dated October 5, 1937), in which he believed the book to be the first of its kind, an African American fictional saga encompassing slavery and its impact. Wright also felt the beginning portion of the book intimately portrayed Southern African Americans, based on his first hand knowledge; but then in the second half of the book he portrayed Northern African Americans in a poor fashion. These Low Grounds (1937) was compared in a few book reviews to the Zora Neale Hurston novel Their Eyes Were Watching God (1937), because they were released at the same period.

His novel O Canaan! (1939), is about African American migratory farmers during the Great Depression. The Rootless (1957) is a novel that focuses on the history of slavery in Maryland during the 18th century.

== Death and legacy ==
Turpin died on November 19, 1968.

In 1977, author Nick Aaron Ford wrote about Turpin posthumously, and his admiration for his work. The Waters Edward Turpin Collection (1949–1968) is located at Morgan State University in Baltimore. West Virginia University's Storer College Digital Collection contains photographs of Turpin while he was teaching at Storer. In 1983, Morgan State University initiated the Nick Aaron Ford and Waters Edward Turpin Symposium on African-American Literature.

== Publications ==
=== Novels ===
- Turpin, Waters Edward (1937). These Low Grounds. New York City, NY: Harper & Brother.
- O Canaan! (1939)
- The Rootless (1957)

=== Textbooks ===
- Basic Skills for Better Writing (1959), co-author
- Extending Horizons: Selected Readings for Cultural Enrichment (1969), co-editor
