= Darby station =

SEPTA station

Darby
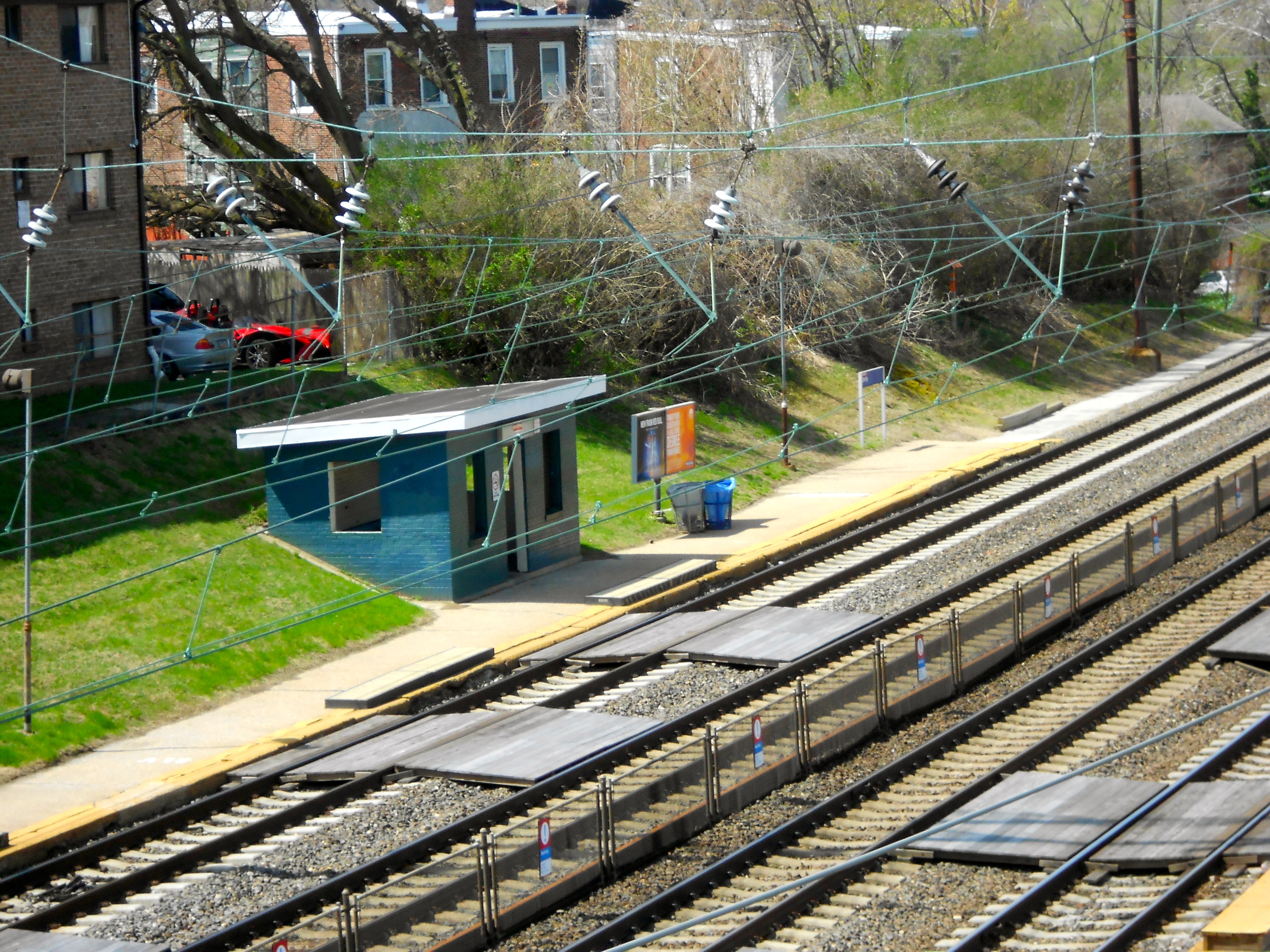
- Darby station as seen from above

General information
- Location: 399 South 4th Street; Darby, Pennsylvania, U.S.
- Coordinates: 39°54′47″N 75°15′17″W
- Owner: SEPTA
- Line: Amtrak Northeast Corridor
- Platforms: 2 side platforms
- Tracks: 4

Construction
- Parking: 21 spaces
- Accessible: No

Other information
- Fare zone: 2

History
- Opened: November 18, 1872
- Electrified: 1928

Services
Preceding station	SEPTA	Following station
Curtis Park toward Newark	Wilmington/Newark Line	Penn Medicine Station toward Temple University
Former services
Preceding station	Pennsylvania Railroad	Following station
Curtis Park toward Wilmington	Wilmington Line	Philadelphia toward Suburban Station
Location

Darby station is a SEPTA Regional Rail station in Darby, Pennsylvania. It is located on the Northeast Corridor at 4th and Colwyn Streets, and serves the Wilmington/Newark Line.

The station sits southeast from the Darby Transportation Center, a SEPTA bus and trolley terminal that is the terminus of Routes 11 and 13 of the SEPTA Subway–Surface Trolley Lines. There are no connections between the two stations.

Darby once had two other railroad stations. One, owned by the Baltimore and Ohio Railroad (now the Philadelphia Subdivision of CSX), sat at Main and Sixth Streets, where the SEPTA Route 11 trolley crosses today. The other, owned by the Pennsylvania Railroad, stood where the current station stands, and later across the tracks.

== Station layout ==
Darby has two low-level side platforms with pathways connecting the platforms to the inner tracks.
