= Estelle Ricketts =

American composer

Estelle Ricketts (c. 1867 – after April 1, 1940) was an American composer.

== Personal life ==
Ricketts was born in Darby, Pennsylvania, which is now a suburb of Philadelphia. Her parents were Allen and Mary (Carroll) Ricketts. Allen was born into slavery in Maryland and self emancipated about age 11. He ended up in Darby, Pennsylvania, and taken in by Quakers, John and Rachel Hunt, where he worked as their gardener and chore boy. There he was educated at the Darby Friends School. He graduated and became a farmer at the Sharon Boarding Academy. In June of 1847, Allen was tricked, kidnapped, and taken to Baltimore and sold to a slave trader named Hope H. Slatter. Because Allen was literate, he was able to write a letter to George S. Truman, a friend back in Darby. Upon receiving the letter, Truman went with a friend, John Needles, to find Slatter and bargain for Allen's release. Slatter agreed to take $800 for the release of Allen, but only if the money was provided by the same day the following week. With the help of Darby Monthly Meeting minister, John Jackson, they were able to get word out about Allen's kidnapping and they had soon collected $500 from residents of Darby, with a wealthy Friend of Philadelphia chipping in the final $300. After nearly 2 weeks of confinement, on the June 24, 1847, Allen was released by Slatter. Allen married Mary Elizabeth Carroll on March 27, 1860 at the Church of the Evangelist in Philadelphia. In the 1860 census, Allen lived with his wife, Mary, in what is now Elmwood Park (Darby is located just west of here across Cobbs Creek) and worked as a coach driver. By 1870, Allen and his family were living in Darby. In the 1900 census, Allen operated a boarding stable. Allen died in 1910 at the age of 91.

Ricketts married Clyde Ray in 1900, and had two children. By 1929, Ricketts was residing with her family in Moorestown, New Jersey.

== Career ==
Estelle Ricketts's 1893 parlor piano piece Rippling Spring Waltz is the earliest known piano solo written by a black woman. Rickets is mentioned in a book entitled "The Work of the Afro-American Woman" written by Gertrude Bustill Mossell. This book highlights the achievements of African-American women in all different disciplines, and was published in 1908.

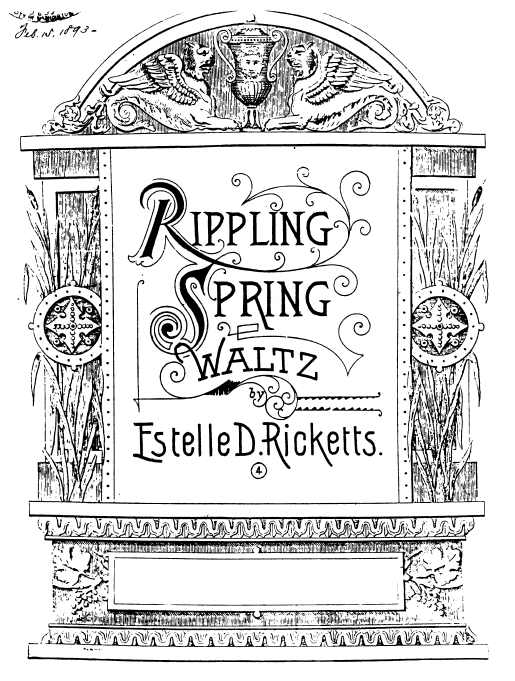
The frontispiece to Ricketts's "Rippling Spring Waltz"
