= James N. Robertson =

American politician

Member of the Pennsylvania House of Representatives from the Delaware County district
- In office 1949–1952

Personal details
- Born: May 24, 1913 Darby, Pennsylvania, U.S.
- Died: October 3, 1990 (aged 77) West Chester, Pennsylvania, U.S.
- Resting place: Arlington National Cemetery, Arlington County, Virginia, U.S.
- Party: Republican
- Education: Princeton University (A.B.) University of Pennsylvania (LL.B.)
- Occupation: Attorney

James Nelson Robertson (May 24, 1913 – October 3, 1990) was an American politician from Pennsylvania who served as a Republican member of the Pennsylvania House of Representatives for Delaware County from 1949 to 1952.

== Early life and education ==
Robertson was born in Darby, Pennsylvania and graduated from Darby High School in 1928 and Mercersburg Academy in 1931. He received an A.B. in politics from Princeton University in 1935 after completing a senior thesis titled "A Pennsylvanian." He then received a LL.B. from the University of Pennsylvania in 1938. After graduation, he was accepted into the Delaware County Bar Association and began the practice of law in Media, Pennsylvania.

== Military service ==
Robertson was commissioned a reserve officer in the Field Artillery branch of the United States Army. He served in Europe during World War II as a general staff officer in intelligence for the 65th Infantry Division. He received the Bronze Star Medal for valor, the French Croix de Guerre and the Russian Guard Medal.

In 1965, Robertson achieved the rank of Brigadier general in the Pennsylvania National Guard.

== Career ==
Robertson was elected to the Pennsylvania House of Representatives for Delaware County and served from 1949 to 1952. He was not a candidate for reelection for the 1953 term.

He served as the recorder of deeds for Delaware County from 1980 to 1984 and as secretary treasurer of the Delaware County Industrial Development Authority at the time of his death.

Robertson died in West Chester, Pennsylvania and is interred at the Arlington National Cemetery in Arlington, Virginia.

== Personal life ==
Robertson was married to Jane Neumann Robertson and together they had two children.
