= William Darrell (Jesuit) =

English theologian

William Darrell, born 1651 in Buckinghamshire, England and died 28 February 1721 at St. Omer's College, France, was an English Jesuit theologian and writer.

He was a member of the Catholic family Darrell of Scotney Castle, Sussex, being the only son of Thomas Darrell and his wife, Thomassine Marcham. He joined the Society of Jesus on 7 September 1671, and was professed 25 March 1689.

== Works ==
Darrell wrote:

- A Vindication of St. Ignatius from Phanaticism and of the Jesuits from the calumnies laid to their charge in a late book (by Henry Wharton) entitled The Enthusiasm of the Church of Rome (London, 1688)
- Moral Reflections on the Epistles and Gospels of every Sunday throughout the Year (London, 1711, and frequently reprinted);
- The Gentleman Instructed in the conduct of a virtuous and happy life (10th ed., London, 1732; frequently reprinted and translated into Italian and Hungarian);
- Theses Theologicæ (Liège, 1702);
- The Case Reviewed in answer to Leslie's "Case Stated" (2nd ed., London, 1717);
- A Treatise of the Real Presence (London,1721).

He translated Discourses of Cleander and Eudoxus upon the Provincial Letters from the French (1701). Thomas Jones in his edition of Peck's Popery Tracts (1859), also attributes to Darrell: A Letter on King James the Second's most gracious Letter of Indulgence (1687); The Layman's Opinion sent ... to a considerable Divine in the Church of England (1687); A Letter to a Lady (1688); The Vanity of Human Respects (1688).
