= Sharon Hill station (SEPTA Regional Rail) =

Rail station in Sharon Hill, Pennsylvania, United States

Sharon Hill
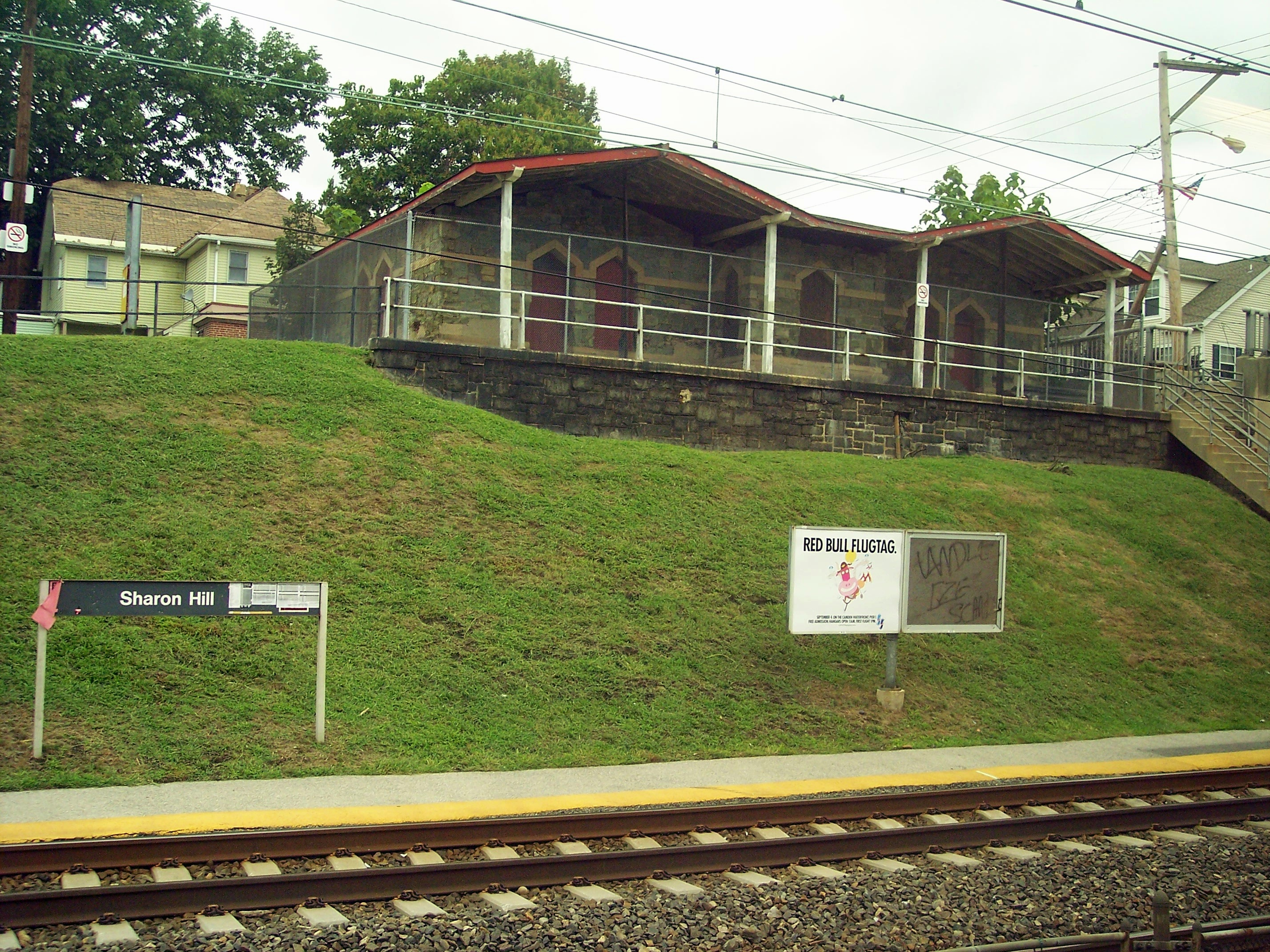
- Sharon Hill station with abandoned station building above

General information
- Location: 414 Sharon Avenue; Sharon Hill, Pennsylvania
- Coordinates: 39°54′15″N 75°16′15″W
- Owner: SEPTA
- Line: Amtrak Northeast Corridor
- Platforms: 2 side platforms
- Tracks: 4
- Connections: SEPTA Suburban Bus: 115

Construction
- Parking: 36 spaces
- Accessible: No

Other information
- Fare zone: 2

History
- Opened: November 18, 1872
- Electrified: 1928

Services
Preceding station	SEPTA	Following station
Folcroft toward Newark	Wilmington/Newark Line	Curtis Park toward Temple University
Former services
Preceding station	Pennsylvania Railroad	Following station
Folcroft toward Wilmington	Wilmington Line	Academy Closed 1949 toward Suburban Station
Folcroft toward Wilmington	Wilmington Line	Curtis Park toward Suburban Station
Location

Sharon Hill is an active commuter railroad station in the borough of Sharon Hill, Delaware County, Pennsylvania. Located at the Sharon Avenue overpass, the station services trains of SEPTA Regional Rail's Wilmington/Newark Line from Center City, Philadelphia to the two namesake termini (Wilmington and Newark) in the state of Delaware. Sharon Hill also has the terminus of the Metro D2 line, which is located on Roberts Road (U.S. Route 13). No connections are offered between the two stations. Amtrak services along the Northeast Corridor bypass Sharon Hill station. Sharon Hill station has two low-level side platforms around the four tracks.

Sharon Hill station opened on November 18, 1872 with the opening of the Darby Improvement of the Philadelphia, Wilmington and Baltimore Railroad, realigning service to Philadelphia, Pennsylvania. The station depot at Sharon Hill was closed in 1983 and left for abandonment. By 1991, the roof had collapsed on the station and a demolition order had been issued. After managing to prevent demolition, a local historical society helped raised money to get a new roof on the depot and repair the station, which occurred in 1993 and 1994.

== Station layout ==
Sharon Hill has two low-level side platforms with walkways connecting passengers to the inner tracks. Amtrak's Northeast Corridor lines bypass the station via the inner tracks.
