= Darby, Pennsylvania =

Borough in Pennsylvania, US

- Borough
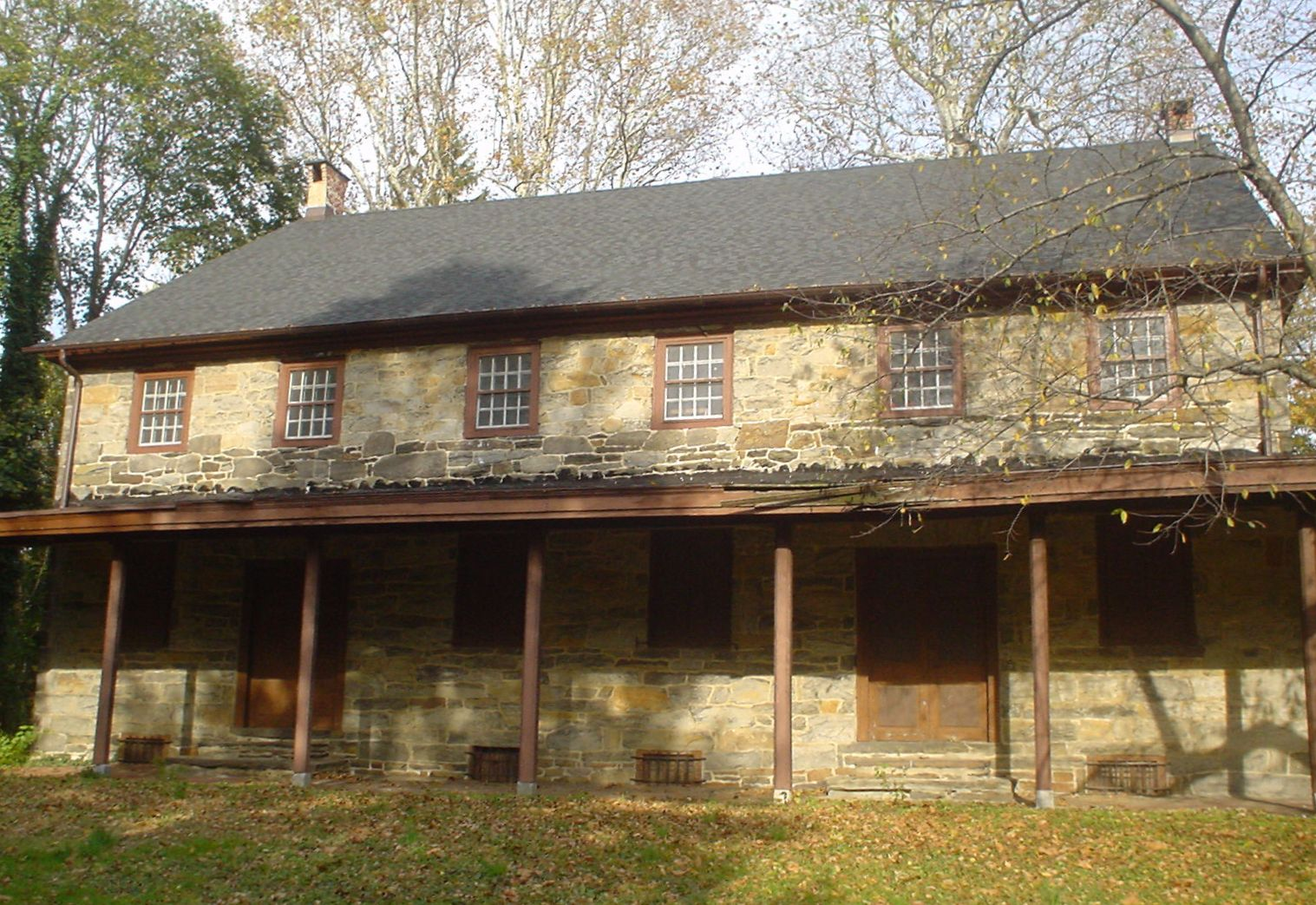
- Darby Friends Meeting House, built 1805

- Location in Delaware County and the U.S. state of Pennsylvania

- Location in Pennsylvania Location in the United States
- Coordinates: 39°55′06″N 75°15′30″W
- Country: United States
- State: Pennsylvania
- County: Delaware

Government
  - Mayor: Darren R. Burrell

Area
  - Total: 0.84 sq mi (2.18 km^{2})
  - Land: 0.84 sq mi (2.18 km^{2})
  - Water: 0 sq mi (0.00 km^{2})
- Elevation: 79 ft (24 m)

Population (2020)
  - Total: 10,715
  - Density: 12,722.2/sq mi (4,912.05/km^{2})
- Time zone: UTC-5 (EST)
  - Summer (DST): UTC-4 (EDT)
- ZIP Code: 19023
- Area codes: 610 and 484
- FIPS code: 42-18152
- Website: www.darbyborough.com

Darby is a borough in Delaware County, Pennsylvania, United States. As of the 2020 census, Darby had a population of 10,715. The borough is located along Darby Creek, 5 miles (8.0 km) southwest of Center City Philadelphia. The borough of Darby is distinct from the nearby municipality of Darby Township.

== History ==
=== 17th century ===
Darby was settled in 1682 by seven Quaker families led by abolitionist and fair trade advocate John Blunston. The name Darby is derived from the English city of Derby (pronounced "Darby"), the county town of Derbyshire (pronounced "Darbyshire"), the origin of many early settlers. Incorporated on May 3, 1853, it had 3,429 residents in 1900, 6,305 in 1910, 10,334 in 1940, and 10,687 at the 2010 census.

Darby founder John Blunston immigrated to Pennsylvania in October 1682. He was involved in real estate, agriculture, and goods trading. An early Quaker settler, Blunston was a close associate of William Penn and an active political figure in early Pennsylvania. He first served in the Colonial Assembly from 1683 to 1688. In this early stage of provincial government, Blunston became a strong proponent for the rights of the Assembly. In 1685 Blunston was appointed to a committee that argued against the Provincial Council's practice of enacting laws without legislative approval. In the same year, Blunston led the Assembly in their attempt to impeach Chief Justice Nicholas More. Blunston returned to the Assembly for the 1695 term. During his second period of service in the Assembly, he was elected the 12th Speaker of the Assembly on May 10, 1697. He was re-elected Speaker on May 10, 1699, and again on May 10, 1700. During this time he was instrumental in drafting a new frame of government for the Province. He retired from the Assembly after the 1701 term.

=== 18th century ===
In addition to Blunston's service in the Assembly, he served as a Provincial Councilor starting in 1700 and ending in 1723. He served as justice of the peace for Chester County from 1684 to 1693 and again from 1695 to 1703. He was also actively involved with Darby Quaker Meeting House in what was then Chester County (now Delaware County), and was one of the Quakers who fought to cease the slave trade amongst Friends. He called upon purchasers to boycott products made by slaves as stolen products, thus advocating a "Fair Trade" policy. He represented the Chester Quarterly Meeting at the Philadelphia Yearly Meeting of Friends 17 times between 1688 and 1715.

Darby is home to the fifth-oldest all-volunteer Fire Department and the Darby Free Library, one of the oldest libraries in the United States, founded in 1743. The Darby Friends Burial Ground is the oldest Cemetery in Pennsylvania in continuous use, opened in 1682.

=== 19th century ===
The first temperance society in Pennsylvania, "Darby Association for Discouraging the Unnecessary Use of Spirituous Liquors", was organized at the Darby Friends Meetinghouse in 1819.

In 1833, three of the founding fourteen members of the Pennsylvania Female Anti Slavery Society were members of the Darby Friends Meeting.

=== 20th century ===
An Episcopal Church mission was established in 1911, and admitted to the Episcopal Diocese of Pennsylvania under the name All Saints, Darby in 1950.

Violent racial incidents hit all over the country as part of the 1919 Red Summer. The Darby 1919 lynching attempt was the attempted lynching of Samuel Gorman of Darby on July 23, 1919. Samuel Gorman, a 17-year-old black boy, was sent to jail for the alleged murder of William E. Taylor.

== Geography ==
Darby has a total area of 0.8 square miles (2.1 km^{2}), all land. It has a humid subtropical climate (Cfa) and average monthly temperatures range from 33.6 °F (0.9 °C) in January to 78.3 °F (25.7 °C) in July.

== Demographics ==
Historical population
Census	Pop.	Note	%±
1860	780		—
1870	1,205		54.5%
1880	1,779		47.6%
1890	2,972		67.1%
1900	3,429		15.4%
1910	6,305		83.9%
1920	7,922		25.6%
1930	9,899		25.0%
1940	10,334		4.4%
1950	13,154		27.3%
1960	14,059		6.9%
1970	13,729		−2.3%
1980	11,513		−16.1%
1990	11,140		−3.2%
2000	10,299		−7.5%
2010	10,687		3.8%
2020	10,715		0.3%

=== Racial and ethnic composition ===
Darby borough, Pennsylvania – Racial and ethnic composition Note: the US Census treats Hispanic/Latino as an ethnic category. This table excludes Latinos from the racial categories and assigns them to a separate category. Hispanics/Latinos may be of any race.
Race / Ethnicity (NH = Non-Hispanic)	Pop 2000	Pop 2010	Pop 2020	% 2000	% 2010	2020
White alone (NH)	3,722	1,706	895	36.14%	15.96%	8.35%
Black or African American alone (NH)	6,143	8,330	8,849	59.65%	77.95%	82.59%
Native American or Alaska Native alone (NH)	11	26	25	0.11%	0.24%	0.23%
Asian alone (NH)	84	74	78	0.82%	0.69%	0.73%
Pacific Islander alone (NH)	7	3	0	0.07%	0.03%	0.00%
Other race alone (NH)	29	16	70	0.28%	0.15%	0.65%
Mixed race or Multiracial (NH)	205	304	330	1.99%	2.84%	3.08%
Hispanic or Latino (any race)	98	228	468	0.95%	2.13%	4.37%
Total	10,299	10,687	10,715	100.00%	100.00%	100.00%

=== 2020 census ===
As of the 2020 census, Darby had a population of 10,715. The median age was 32.2 years. 30.0% of residents were under the age of 18 and 11.0% of residents were 65 years of age or older. For every 100 females there were 85.7 males, and for every 100 females age 18 and over there were 80.9 males age 18 and over. 100.0% of residents lived in urban areas, while 0.0% lived in rural areas.

There were 3,537 households in Darby, of which 43.6% had children under the age of 18 living in them. Of all households, 25.0% were married-couple households, 22.9% were households with a male householder and no spouse or partner present, and 44.7% were households with a female householder and no spouse or partner present. About 24.6% of all households were made up of individuals and 7.4% had someone living alone who was 65 years of age or older.

There were 3,916 housing units, of which 9.7% were vacant. The homeowner vacancy rate was 3.1% and the rental vacancy rate was 6.0%.

=== 2000 census ===
As of the 2000 census, there were 10,299 people, 3,405 households and 2,393 families residing in the borough. The population density was 12,624.5 inhabitants per square mile (4,874.3/km^{2}). There were 3,999 housing units at an average density of 4,902.0 per square mile (1,892.7/km^{2}). The racial makeup of the borough was 36.37% White, 60.00% African American, 0.14% Native American, 0.87% Asian, 0.07% Pacific Islander, 0.51% from other races, and 2.04% from two or more races. Hispanic or Latino of any race were 0.95% of the population.

There were 3,405 households, out of which 41.3% had children under the age of 18 living with them, 34.1% were married couples living together, 30.0% had a female householder with no husband present, and 29.7% were non-families. 25.6% of all households were made up of individuals, and 9.0% had someone living alone who was 65 years of age or older. The average household size was 2.88 and the average family size was 3.45.

In the borough the population was spread out, with 33.4% under the age of 18, 7.7% from 18 to 24, 28.2% from 25 to 44, 17.1% from 45 to 64, and 13.6% who were 65 years of age or older. The median age was 32 years. For every 100 females, there were 85.7 males. For every 100 females age 18 and over, there were 75.3 males.

The median income for a household in the borough was $26,938, and the median income for a family was $30,065. Males had a median income of $35,507 versus $22,451 for females. The per capita income for the borough was $16,990. About 35.5% of families and 20.6% of the population were below the poverty line, including 27.6% of those under age 18 and 11.1% of those age 65 or over.

=== Crime ===
Darby is a relatively urban place, with almost twice the population density of nearby Darby Township. The Pennsylvania State Police reported that the crime rate (per capita) in 2011 compared to the per-capita rate for Delaware County as a whole was six times higher for violent crimes (murder, robbery and assault, not including sex crimes), 24 times for property crimes (including arson), but only two times for drug offenses (not including alcohol offenses).

== Education ==
William Penn School District serves Darby. The district was created in 1972; prior to that year, Darby was in the Darby-Colwyn School District.

- Park Lane Elementary School (K-6)
- Walnut Street Elementary School (K-6)
- Penn Wood Middle School (7–8)
- Penn Wood High School, Cypress Street Campus-Freshnman Academy (9) (Yeadon)
- Penn Wood High School, Green Avenue Campus (10–12) (Lansdowne)

The city is also home to Blessed Virgin Mary (BVM), a parochial school affiliated with the Roman Catholic Archdiocese of Philadelphia.

== Transportation ==
=== Highways and roads ===
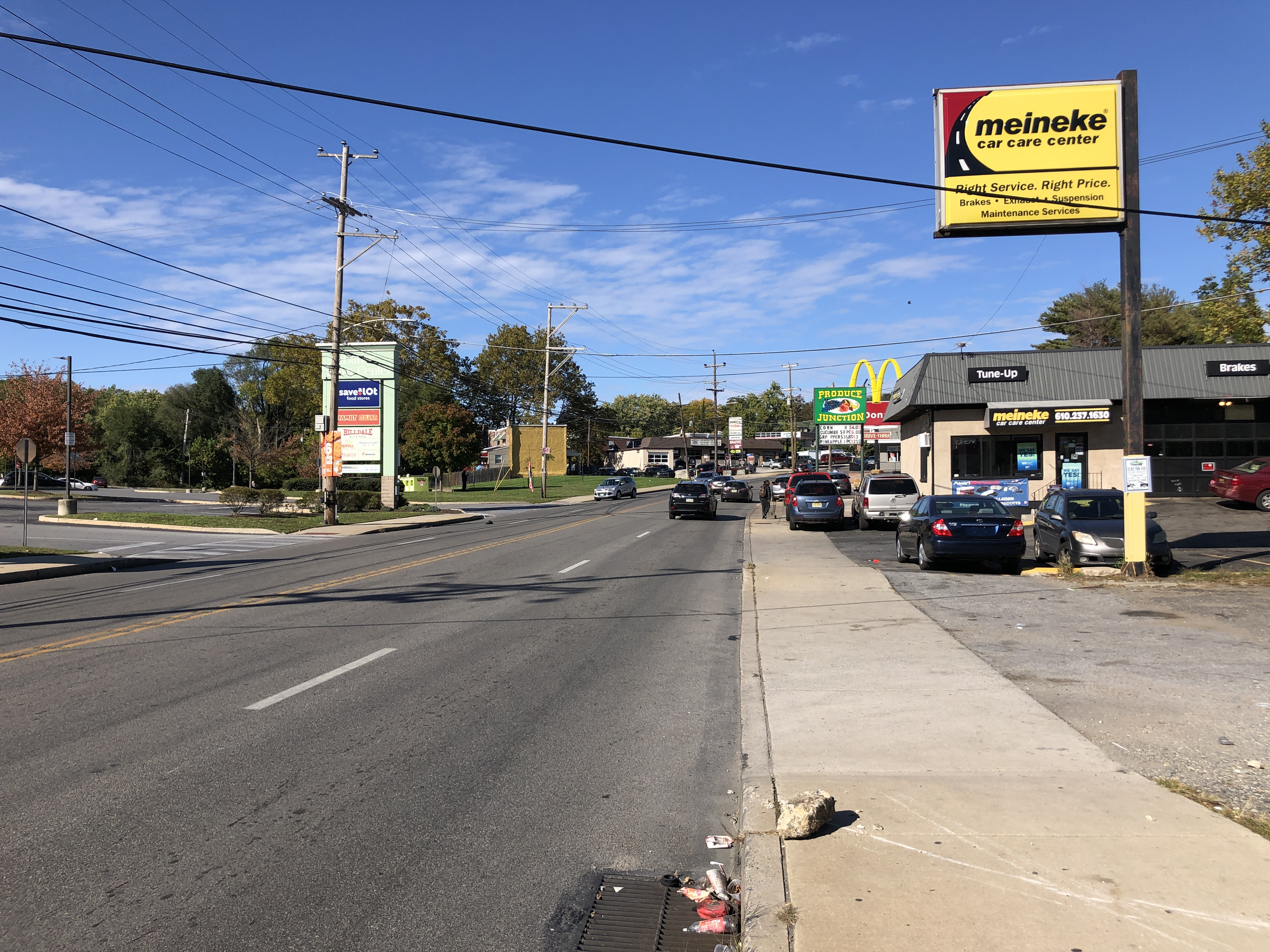
US 13 northbound in Darby

As of 2018, there were 14.14 miles (22.76 km) of public roads in Darby, of which 2.19 miles (3.52 km) were maintained by the Pennsylvania Department of Transportation (PennDOT) and 11.95 miles (19.23 km) were maintained by the borough.

U.S. Route 13 is the only numbered highway serving Darby. It follows a southwest-to-northeast alignment along MacDade Boulevard through the center of the borough.

=== Trains ===
Darby is served by the SEPTA Subway–Surface Trolley Lines number 11 and 13 at the Darby Transportation Center and the SEPTA Wilmington/Newark Line at the Darby station.

Darby once had three other railroad stations. Two, owned by the Baltimore and Ohio Railroad (now the Philadelphia Subdivision of CSX), one at Main and 6th Streets, where the SEPTA Route 11 trolley crosses today, and the other, Boone Station, at Poplar Street and Lawrence Avenue. The Pennsylvania Railroad station was on the site of what is now the SEPTA station for the Wilmington/Newark Line.

== Politics ==
Darby Borough is in Pennsylvania's 5th Congressional district, currently represented by Democrat Mary Gay Scanlon. In the Pennsylvania legislature, Darby is represented by Democrat Joanna E. McClinton in the 191st House District. Darby is in the 8th Pennsylvania Senate District, represented by Democrat Anthony H. Williams.

In local politics, Democrats hold an absolute majority of the borough's council seats, and the mayorship is held by Democrat Darren R. Burrell.

Office	Ward	Holder	Party
Councilwoman (Council President)	3rd Ward	Lucille Pratt	Democratic
Councilwomen Council Vice President	1st Ward	Darlene Hill	Democratic
Councilwoman	1st Ward	Tracey Holmes Williams	Democratic
Councilwoman	1st Ward	Cheryl Butts	Democratic
Councilwoman	2nd Ward	Janice Davis	Democratic
Councilwomen	2nd Ward	Edna Stockley	Democratic
councilman	2nd Ward	Alfred Robinson Jr.	Democratic
Councilman	3rd Ward	Omar K. Thompson	Democratic
Councilwomen	3rd Ward	Jennifer Parks	Democratic

== Notable people ==
- Mike Barbarick (b. 1959), indoor/outdoor soccer player
- Stephen Barrar (b. 1954), member of the Pennsylvania House of Representatives, 160th district
- John Bartram (politician) (c. 1650–1697), Quaker, early settler and member of the Pennsylvania Provincial Assembly
- John Bartram (1699–1777), Quaker, early American botanist and father of the even more famous traveler and botanist William Bartram. He is buried in Darby at the Friends Burial Ground at 12th and Main Street. Bartram's botanical garden exists nearby and is the oldest surviving botanical garden in the U.S.
- Terry Bowers, Jr. (1958-1970), 11-year-old boy scout whose unsolved murder gained significant regional attenion
- Leo Burt (b. 1948), placed on FBI "Ten Most Wanted" list for his role in the Sterling Hall bombing; born in Darby
- John Drew, Negro league baseball executive
- W.C. Fields, comedian and actor; born in 1880 at the Arlington Hotel, then located at 832 Main Street
- John Patrick Cardinal Foley, former Grand Master of the Equestrian Order of the Holy Sepulchre of Jerusalem and former president of the Pontifical Council for Social Communications, lived in retirement in Darby at the Villa St. Joseph of the Roman Catholic Archdiocese of Philadelphia
- Monica Horan, actress best known for her role as Amy MacDougall on Everybody Loves Raymond
- Jeff LaBar, rock guitarist for Cinderella
- Peter O'Keefe, member of the Pennsylvania House of Representatives, District 161 from 1975 to 1978
- John James Pearson (1800–1888), member of the U.S. House of Representatives
- Estelle Ricketts, first published African-American woman composer
- James N. Robertson, Pennsylvania state representative for Delaware County (1949–1952), brigadier general in the Pennsylvania National Guard
- Frank Sheeran, American mobster and trade unionist; portrayed in The Irishman by Robert De Niro
- John Stanford, former superintendent of the Seattle school district and United States Army officer; born in Darby
- Annis Boudinot Stockton, the first woman poet to be published in the British American colonies
- Chris Wheeler, sports broadcaster

Preceded by Colwyn	Bordering communities of Philadelphia	Succeeded by Yeadon
