= Hermesprota Creek =

Coordinates: 39°52′53″N 75°16′47″W

Location
- Country: United States
- State: Pennsylvania

Physical characteristics
- Length: 2.2 mi (3.5 km)

Hermesprota Creek is a 2.2-mile-long (3.5 km) tributary of Darby Creek in Collingdale, Sharon Hill, Darby Township, and Folcroft in Delaware County, Pennsylvania. Its watershed covers an area of 1.83 square miles (4.7 km^{2}).

== Course ==
Hermesprota Creek begins in the Har Zion Cemetery near the community of Collingdale, Pennsylvania. It flows south-southeast for several tenths of a mile before passing under U.S. Route 13 and turns west and enters Sharon Hill, Pennsylvania. The creek turns south and enters the communities of Darby Township and Folcroft. Hermesprota Creek then enters the John Heinz National Wildlife Refuge and receives two small unnamed tributaries, from the right and left banks respectively. After several hundred feet, it reaches its confluence with Darby Creek.

Hermesprota Creek joins Darby Creek 3.55 miles (5.71 km) upriver of its mouth.

== Hydrology ==
The water quality of Hermesprota Creek is poor. with elevated levels of lead, selenium, and zinc detected in its sediment. Hazardous materials were dumped into the creek from 1953 to the 1970s, when the adjacent Folcroft Landfill was closed. The southern part of the creek is tidally influenced.

== Geography and geology ==
The elevation near the mouth of Hermesprota Creek is 0 feet (0 m) above sea level. The elevation of the creek's source is between 60 and 80 feet (18 and 24 m) above sea level.

== Watershed ==
The watershed of Hermesprota Creek has an area of 1.83 square miles (4.7 km^{2}). The entire creek is in the United States Geological Survey quadrangle of Lansdowne.

== History ==
Hermesprota Creek was entered into the Geographic Names Information System on August 2, 1979. Its identifier in the Geographic Names Information System is 1176873.

Several bridges have been built across Hermesprota Creek. A concrete arch bridge with a length of 30.8 feet (9.4 m) carries Folcroft Avenue over the creek and was built in 1925. A 24.9-foot-long concrete slab bridge was built in 1932 and carries Tribbitt Avenue across the creek.

== Biology ==
The drainage basin of Hermesprota Creek is a Coldwater Fishery and a Migratory Fishery. Recreational fishing occurs in the creek. It is in a NOAA habitat of concern.

== See also ==
- List of Pennsylvania rivers
