= Holy Child Academy (Sharon Hill, Pennsylvania) =

All-female school in Pennsylvania, U.S.

Coordinates: 39.94809°N 75.29335°W

- Sharon Hill, Pennsylvania

Information
- Type: Private, All-Female
- Religious affiliation: Roman Catholic
- Established: September 5, 1864
- Closed: 1973
- Grades: 9-12

Holy Child Academy, also known simply as Sharon, was founded in 1864 by the sisters of Society of the Holy Child Jesus in what today is the town of Sharon Hill, Pennsylvania. It closed in 1973.

== History ==
In the 1860s the Sisters started an educational community in Towanda, Pennsylvania, but the attempt proved to be unsuccessful. At the time the Sisters also administered a night school for working girls in Philadelphia, and they desired to establish yet another school for girls in that area. In 1864, Mother Cornelia Connelly, the foundress of the order, was informed that in Darby, Pennsylvania, an estate called Sharon, home of the Jackson Female Academy, was for sale and that it would be a suitable location for a convent and a school. Mother Connelly promptly purchased the property, and soon after, a group consisting of six Sisters set out from Philadelphia to Darby to staff the order's newest school.

=== Sharon ===
Sharon was located off the Chester Turnpike, today called Chester Pike, a brief walk from the toll house on Calcon Hook Road and set in a wooded and peaceful area. The Sisters were delighted with their new home. Sharon was in essence a miniature village: in addition to the school and the convent, there was also a farm and a dairy. Mother Connelly visited the school within a few years of its founding and was pleased with what she and her Sisters had accomplished.

As the years passed homes sprang up in Sharon's vicinity. In 1890, Sharon and this adjacent area ceded from the town of Darby and incorporated the borough of Sharon Hill. A visit to Sharon Hill today shows that virtually all of its old Victorian homes are located within walking distance of where Sharon once stood, which is now the site of Academy Park High School.

=== Growth and change ===
Also in 1890 a four-story, red brick school building was built to replace the existing structure that had housed the Jackson Female Academy. In 1899, a Gothic-style chapel was added to the campus. Sharon's convent served as the novitiate for the Holy Child sisters until the 1940s, when the novitiate was moved to Rosemont, Pennsylvania.

Sharon was considered to be the heart of the Holy Child order in America. The school accepted boarders from around the world until the 1950s, when the dorms were converted into classrooms. Holy Child Academy was regarded as one of the most prestigious girls' private schools in the Philadelphia area, and when the enrollment reached several hundred students in the 1960s, a new and bigger school was built.

The two-story white and gray modern-style new school was consecrated by John Cardinal Krol in 1963. The red brick school building now served as an expanded library and art room.

=== Final classes ===
In 1969, the announcement was made that enrollment had plummeted and there was a lack of Sisters to teach at the school. No new students would be admitted, and the current enrollment would be phased out. The last graduating class of 76 students departed Sharon in May 1973. At the time, Sister Mary Algeo, S.H.C.J., was principal.

== Post-closure legacy ==
Though the school was closed, the Sisters continued to live in the convent, but soon the property was purchased by the Southeast Delco School District. By the late 1970s, the Sisters had been relocated to a mansion on nearby Woodland Avenue as well as to a Tudor-style house called the Cornelian House located on nearby School Street across from Holy Spirit School, which was also staffed by the Sisters. The new Sharon school building that had been dedicated in 1963 became Central Junior High School, and the Gothic-style stone gymnasium used by Sharon was now dedicated to the junior high's use, as well as for use by various children's athletic and social groups.

The red brick school building and the chapel were left to languish and soon fell prey to vandals. However, the grounds continued to maintain their beauty and became a popular spot for walking, jogging, and bicycling.

In October 1978, the red brick school building and the chapel were demolished. With the exception of the junior high and the gym, the property would remain vacant until 1984, when the new Academy Park High School was built.

The junior high still stands today, but it was decommissioned in the early 1980s, and the students were transferred to Ashland Middle School in Glenolden. Today the building that had its incarnation as first the new Sharon school and then as the Central Junior High School is now a wing of Academy Park High School. The gym also remains; it was renovated in 2010 and is used as an auxiliary gymnasium for the high school.

The Holy Child sisters continued to staff Holy Spirit School. Because of a lack of religious personnel, the school eventually fell under the administration of a lay faculty and closed its doors in 2003.

== Bibliography ==
- Kathleen Clarke, Jean Shiber, Sharon Hill Historical Society, Sharon Hill (Arcadia Publishing, 2009), ISBN 978-0-7385-5686-4, p. 61. Excerpt available at Google Books.
- History of Sharon Hill by Mary Meehan
