= Delaware County Community College =

Two-year college in Pennsylvania, U.S.

Coordinates: 39.966793°N 75.391788°W

- Motto: Find yourself here.
- Type: Public community college
- Established: 1967
- Endowment: $2.19 million
- President: Marta Yera Cronin
- Faculty: 144 full-time; 658 part-time
- Students: 10,073
- Location: Marple Township, Pennsylvania, U.S.
- Campus: Marple Campus (main campus) Chester County Hospital Downingtown Campus Southeast Center Pennocks Bridge Campus Brandywine Center Phoenixville Campus
- Newspaper: The Communitarian
- Colors: Blue & white
- Nickname: Phantoms
- Sporting affiliations: NJCAA; EPAC
- Website: DCCC.edu
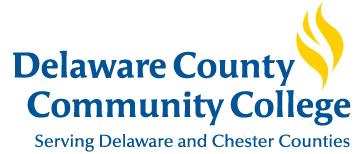

Delaware County Community College (DCCC) is a public community college with campuses and facilities throughout Delaware and Chester Counties in Pennsylvania. DCCC was founded in 1967 and is accredited by the Middle States Commission on Higher Education. The college offers 53 associate degree programs and 43 certificate programs at nine different locations.

DCCC's athletic teams compete in Division III of the National Junior College Athletic Association (NJCAA) and are members of the Eastern Pennsylvania Athletic Conference. They are collectively known as the Phantoms and have won two men's basketball championships.

In 2021, DCCC was named a Center of Excellence for Domestic Maritime Workforce Training and Education for preparing students for U.S. maritime industry careers.

== History ==
=== Early years ===
The origin of DCCC can be traced back to 1963, when Pennsylvania legislature permitted the establishment of state community colleges through the Community College Act of 1963.

In 1964, when the Delaware County Council for Higher Education was formed, Delaware County residents were presented with a survey, the results of which showed they wanted a community college in the area. The council subsequently assigned a task force to identify a permanent location for the college. Simultaneously, Delaware County commissioners were supporting the potential expansion of Pennsylvania State University (PSU) into the area. Despite the debate over which school would have a presence in Delaware County, Pennsylvania's board of education approved the establishment of DCCC in January 1967. (That year, Penn State Brandywine was established in Delaware County as an extension of PSU).

Although DCCC was officially founded on March 1, 1967, it did not yet have its own facility. Under the leadership of DCCC's first president Douglas F. Libby Jr., classes commenced in September at Ridley Township High School with 307 students enrolled. Once DCCC had an established board of trustees, a committee was appointed to continue searching for a permanent site for the college.

By 1968, additional DCCC classes were temporarily being held at the Fair Acres Delaware County Institution District and the Dante School, a former orphanage in Concordville, Pennsylvania. After delays caused by legal disputes over building a permanent facility in Delaware County, DCCC entered into an agreement of sale with the heirs to the Gideon Stull estate in May 1968. Following the agreement, DCCC submitted an application to the Marple Township Planning Commission and Zoning Board requesting exception from residential zoning. Upon denial of its request, DCCC appealed the board's decision, which led to a Pennsylvania Supreme Court ruling in DCCC's favor in July 1969. That same month, DCCC officially closed on the Gideon Stull estate for approximately $1.25 million.

By 1974, the $18.5 million Academic Building and Learning Support Building were fully constructed. DCCC's Marple Campus was dedicated in November.

In 2026, the college laid off over 50 employees.

=== Presidents ===
Following Libby's retirement, Richard D. DeCosmo served as DCCC's second president from 1980 until his retirement in 2003. Under his leadership, new skills-based degree and certificate programs were added to those established during Libby's administration. Additionally, DeCosmo advocated for improved economic conditions for Delaware County though access to adult basic education, GED preparation and skill training. To accomplish this, he requested reduced Pell Grant eligibility requirements to make higher education accessible to the increased percentage of Delaware County residents living below the poverty level.

Before his 2003 appointment as the third president, Jerome S. Parker had served as a DCCC staff member since 1977. As president, he pushed for updated facilities and technical training at DCCC to advance the college and continue its mission to improve the local community's economy. Five additional campuses in Delaware and Chester Counties were opened and DCCC built alliances with companies such as Aker Philadelphia Shipyard, Boeing and Sunoco to prepare students for open industry positions. Parker is credited with playing a major role in the development of DCCC's Advanced Technology Center, which was named after him upon his retirement in 2017 (see Campus section below).

In 2017, L. Joy Gates Black became president of DCCC. She is the first African-American female to serve in this position at the college. In 2019, DCCC and the Archdiocese of Philadelphia signed a $3 million agreement of sale. Plans were announced for the construction of a new DCCC campus at the former Monsignor Bonner & Archbishop Prendergast Catholic High School. The campus was planned to open in spring 2022 and would integrate the Southeast and Upper Darby Centers (see Campus section below). Although it did not officially open during that period, it offered its Spring Open House events on May 8 and May 12, respectively. In 2020, Gates Black was recognized for founding DCCC's first Center for Equity and Social Justice.

Marta Yera Cronin, Ed.D., is the current president of Delaware County Community College. Cronin began her tenure as president on July 1, 2023, becoming the college’s fifth president since its founding and the second woman and first Latina to hold the position. She has been criticized for eliminating and outsourcing the Counseling Department.

== Campus ==
DCCC has eight locations. All except Chester County Hospital offer all of the following: a bookstore, career and counseling center, an Enrollment Central for student assistance services, disability services, student lounges, study areas and a Learning Commons that offers tutoring and technology support to the DCCC community. The degree and certificate programs offered vary by location.

=== Delaware County Campuses ===
==== Marple Campus ====
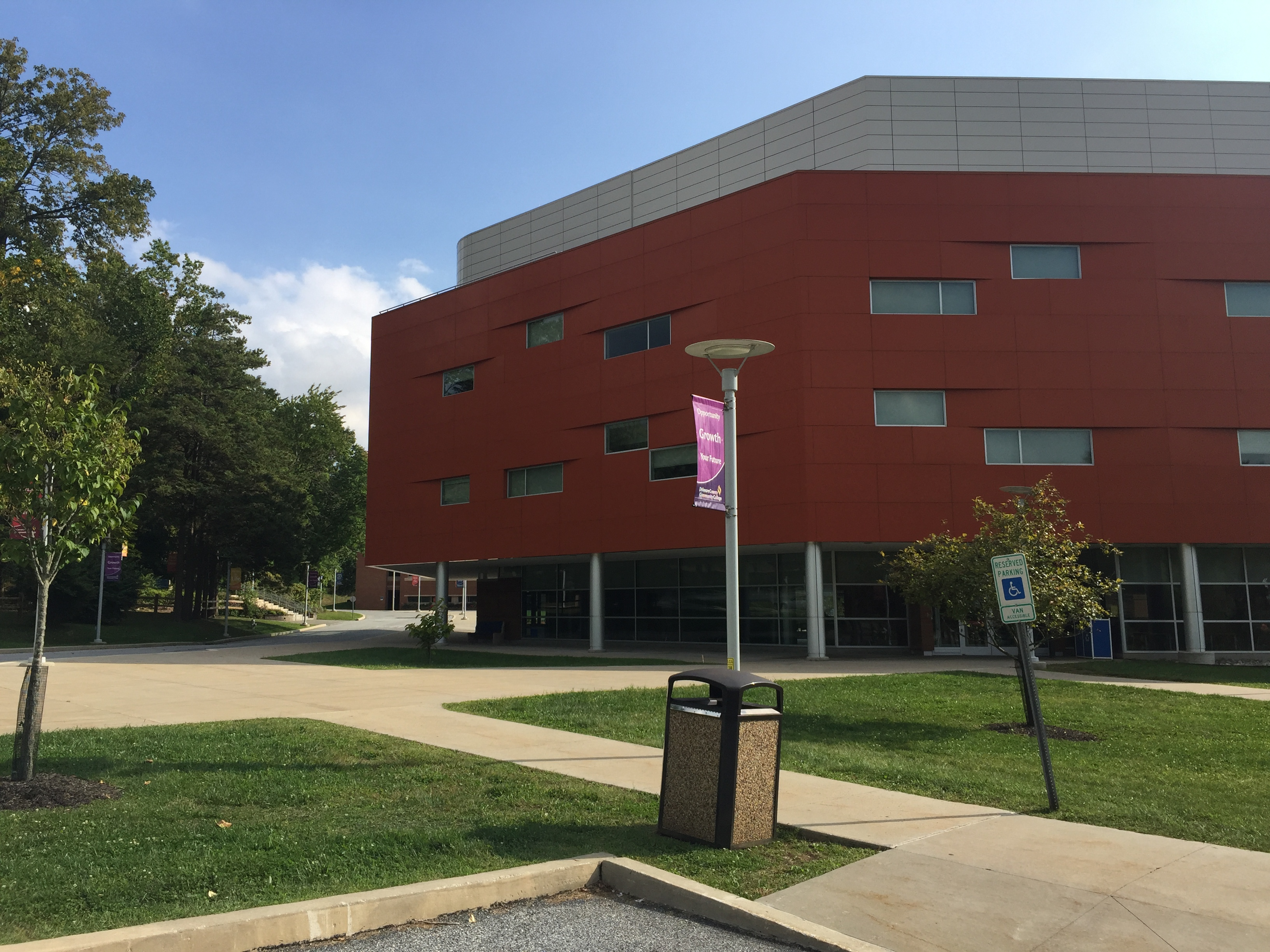
Delaware County Community College main campus in 2017.

Marple Campus is the main campus of DCCC. It is located in Marple Township, Pennsylvania, with a Media mailing address, and covers 123 acres (0.50 km^{2}). Opened in 1974, it houses DCCC's radio station, baseball and soccer field and basketball and tennis courts. Marple Campus is also the home of DCCC's municipal police academy, which has trained more than 95 percent of all Delaware County and 75 percent of all Chester County police officers for the last 40 years.

The four main buildings on Marple Campus are Founders Hall, the Academic Building, the STEM Center and the Jerome S. Parker Advanced Technology Center.

Founders Hall houses most of DCCC's administrative offices, a cafeteria and the Learning Commons. Also located in Founders Hall are Enrollment Central and the Nazz Mariani Veterans Center for veterans programs.

The Academic Building is the largest main building on Marple Campus. It contains the Student Center for campus life activities, the Career and Counseling Center, art studios, an art gallery, an auditorium for theater and other large events, faculty offices and PA CareerLink®.

The STEM Center and Advanced Technology Center are a part of the $60 million STEM Complex that opened during the 2009–2010 academic year. The STEM Center is a four-story, 105,000 ft^{2} (9,800 m^{2}) building that houses classrooms, a fitness center, aerobics studio, computer lounge and café. It shares 23 science and specialized laboratories with the Advanced Technology Center. The Advanced Technology Center is a 32,000 ft^{2} (3,000 m^{2}) building that houses classrooms and laboratories for DCCC's technical programs.

==== Southeast Center ====
The Southeast Center campus is located in the Folcroft Business Park near Academy Park High School in Sharon Hill, Pennsylvania. It spans 26,000 ft^{2} (2,400 m^{2}). The campus opened in 2004 with 15 general and computer classrooms, a self-service café and dining area and social services.

==== Upper Darby Center ====
The Upper Darby Center campus is located behind the Barclay Square Shopping Center on Garrett Road in Upper Darby Township, Pennsylvania. The campus opened in 2012 and has six classrooms. It has the capacity to serve up to 1,800 students each year.

=== Chester County Campuses ===
==== Chester County Hospital ====
DCCC has partnered with Chester County Hospital since 1998 to offer nursing education to Chester County residents at the hospital. The hospital is located in West Chester, Pennsylvania.

==== Downingtown Campus ====
Downingtown Campus is located on the site of the former Downingtown Industrial and Agricultural School on Route 322 in Downingtown, Pennsylvania. Opened in 2002, the $12.5 million facility has 46,000 ft^{2} (4,300 m^{2}) of space, laboratories and nine general classrooms. In 2018, the 16,000 ft^{2} (1,500 m^{2}) STEM Wing opened and offers eight additional classrooms for DCCC's STEM programs.

==== Pennocks Bridge Campus ====
Pennocks Bridge Campus is located in West Grove, Pennsylvania. It was opened in 2008 and shares 125,000 ft^{2} (11,600 m^{2}) of space with the Chester County Intermediate Unit's (CCIU) Technical College High School West Grove. The building contains general classrooms, laboratories and workshops for students.

==== Brandywine Center ====
The Brandywine Center campus is located on Boot Road in Downingtown, Pennsylvania. Opened in fall 2012, the 175,000 ft^{2} (16,300 m^{2}) building sits on 8.7 acres (0.035 km^{2}). The campus partners with the CCIU to offer career and technical education programs as well as college credit courses to students of Technical College High School Brandywine.

==== Phoenixville Campus ====
Phoenixville Campus is located on Charlestown Road in Phoenixville, Pennsylvania. It was opened in 2013 and shares space with CCIU's Technical College High School Pickering.

== Administration and organization ==
DCCC operates under five academic divisions: Allied Health & Nursing; Business, Computing & Social Science; Communications, Arts & Humanities; Science, Technology, Engineering and Math; and Workforce Development & Economic Development.

A typical academic year is broken up into two 10-week terms during the fall (August–December) and spring (January–May). Within the terms are two seven-week accelerated sessions. The winter term is one month long for online classes only. The full summer term is 12 weeks long (May–August). Within the term are two accelerated sessions that each last approximately five weeks. An academic year begins on the first day of the fall term and ends on the last day of the summer term.

DCCC's endowment had a market value of approximately $2.19 million in the fiscal year that ended in 2019.

=== Sponsoring school districts ===
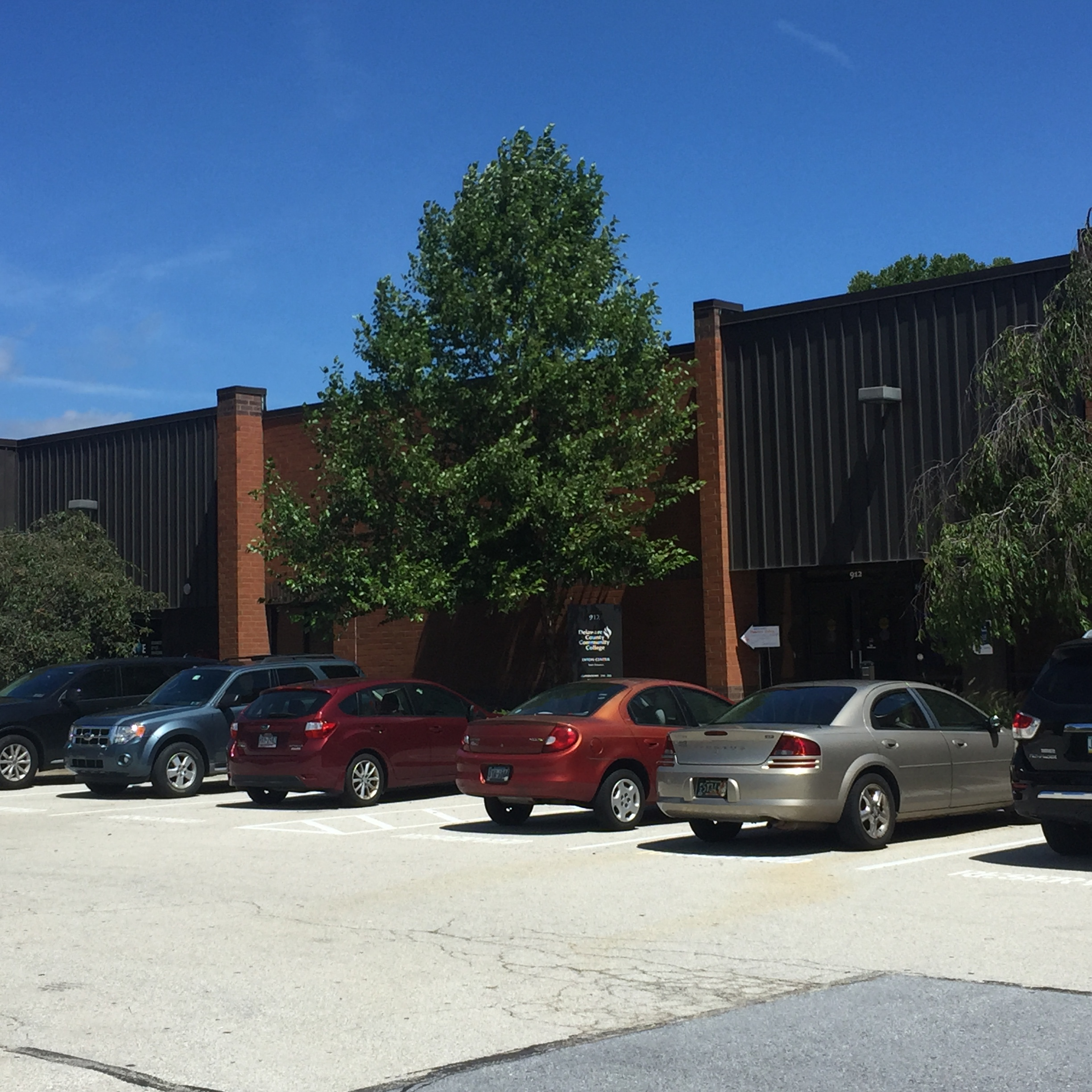
Exton Center

DCCC is partially funded through tax programs maintained by the respective school districts of Delaware County:

- Chester Upland School District
- Garnet Valley School District (Bethel residents only)
- Haverford Township School District
- Interboro School District
- Radnor Township School District
- Ridley School District
- Rose Tree Media School District
- Southeast Delco School District
- Springfield School District
- Upper Darby School District
- Wallingford-Swarthmore School District (Swarthmore and Rutledge residents only)
- William Penn School District

School district sponsorship allows students and residents of each sponsoring school district to access DCCC's courses and degree programs for a reduced tuition rate.

== Academics and programs ==
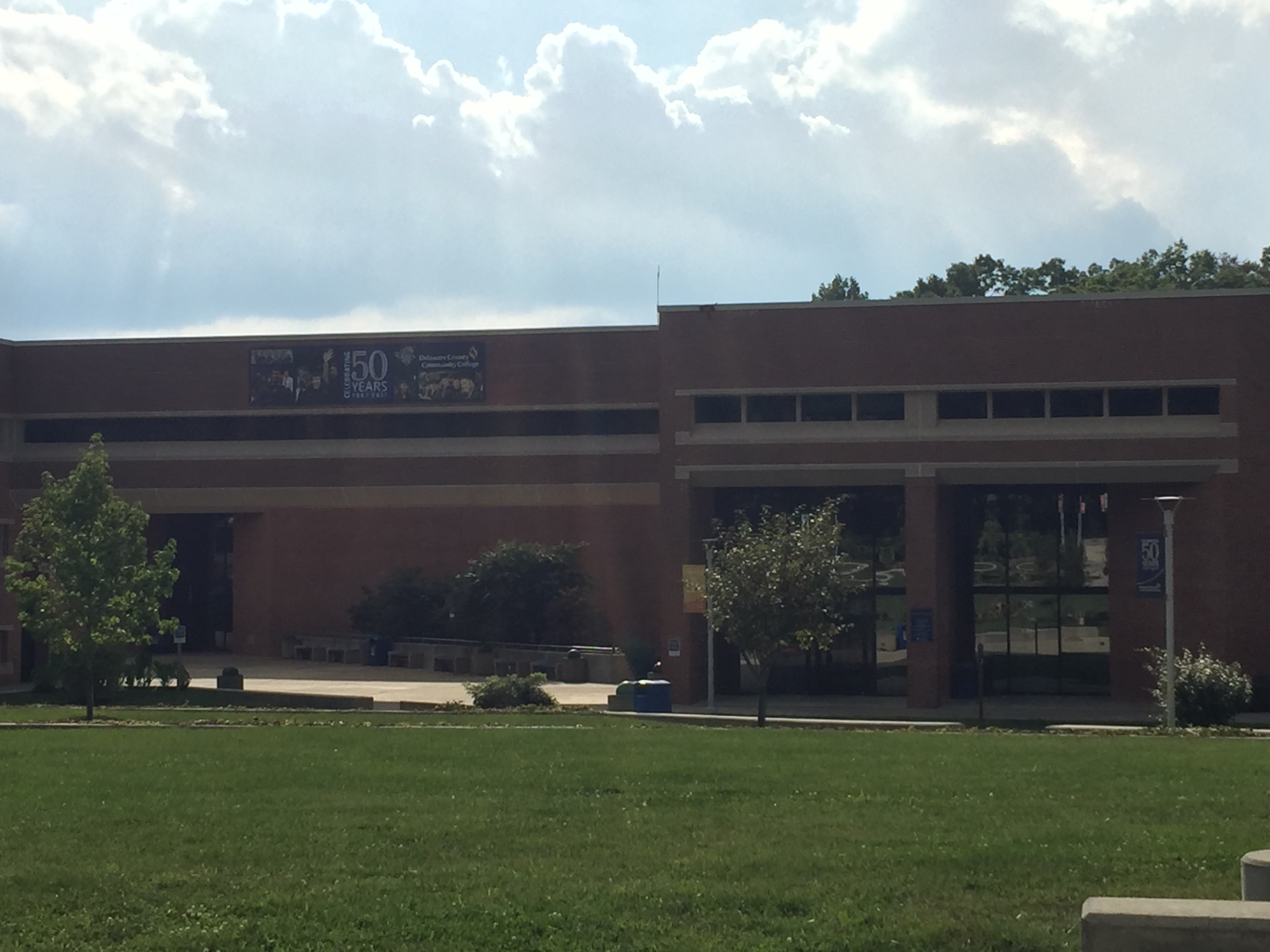
The main campus of Delaware County Community College

DCCC has an open admissions policy and accepts life experience as credits. In addition to its associate and certificate degree programs, DCCC offers non-credit enrichment, job training and certification courses through its Continuing Education program.

DCCC has dual admissions agreements with several four-year universities in the Philadelphia area that allow students to automatically transfer after completing an associate degree. Villanova University offers a Guaranteed Admissions program and West Chester University and Temple University each offer a Letter of Intent Program.

DCCC has one of the largest KEYS (Keystone Education Yields Success) programs in the state of Pennsylvania. The government-funded program helps students who are Temporary Assistance for Needy Families (TANF) and/or Supplemental Nutrition Assistance Program (SNAP) recipients achieve their career and economic goals.

== Student Life ==
=== Student body ===
As of fall 2019, DCCC's student body consists of 10,073 students. There are 27 percent full time and 73 percent part-time students.

Demographics of student body in fall 2019
	Full and Part Time Students	U.S. Census (Note: People who identify as Hispanic/Latino are included in applicable race categories.)
International	1%	N/A
Multiracial American	5%	2.8%
Black/African American	28%	13.4%
American Indian and Alaska Native	0%	1.3%
Asian	5%	5.9%
Non-Hispanic White American	52%	60.1%
Hispanic/Latino American	2%	18.5%
Native Hawaiian and Other Pacific Islander	0%	0.2%
Other/Unknown	6%	N/A

=== Organizations ===
More than 30 student clubs and organizations operate at DCCC, including student government, special interest and service organizations.

Cultural groups on campus include: American Sign Language Club, Black Student Union, Campus Bible Fellowship, LatinX Student Association, LGBTQ+ Club, Multicultural Club and Mutual Africa. The Sexuality and Gender Awareness (SAGA) Club is headquartered at the Pennocks Bridge campus.

==== Publications ====
The Communitarian, DCCC's independent student-alumni newspaper, originally began as a mimeographed sheet in 1967. It is published four times each semester and features work by current and former students of the Fundamentals of Journalism courses offered at DCCC.

Pegasus, a student-run literary magazine published each spring, features literary works by DCCC students.

The Student Writing Journal, a peer-reviewed online journal, features superior academic works by DCCC students.

DCCC's New Media Lab houses three podcast productions that feature DCCC news and events (This Must Be Heard), readings of students' literary and nonfiction works (The Written) and discussions of popular forms of entertainment (Study Break).

== Athletics ==
The DCCC athletic teams have been known as the Phantoms since 1967, when students and faculty helped select the school's mascot.

The DCCC athletic association chairs eight varsity athletic programs, which are open to full-time students and any part-time students who have completed at least 30 credit hours at DCCC. The Phantoms belong to the Eastern Pennsylvania Athletic Conference and Region 19 of the NJCAA. Men's sports include: baseball, basketball, golf and soccer. Women's sports include: basketball, cross country, indoor and outdoor track & field and volleyball. As of fall 2021, the women's volleyball program has returned from a hiatus that began in fall 2017.

The Phantoms became nationally affiliated with the NJCAA in 2012. The men's baseball team was the first to make the transition in March 2012 and the men's basketball team soon followed. The remaining sports teams became affiliated as of the 2012–2013 academic year.

DCCC's sports teams have won two EPCC championships in men's basketball in 1996 and 2012, and one EPCC championship in baseball in 2010-11, which was also the only undefeated season in EPCC history for baseball.

=== Athletic Facilities ===
Students, student-athletes, faculty and staff are granted access to the fitness center and programs at DCCC's Marple Campus. Basketball home games are played at FiDonce Gymnasium in Chester, PA.

== Notable alumni ==
- Callahan Bright, American football defensive lineman
- Dean Demopoulos, collegiate and professional basketball coach
- Steve Gerben. creator and star of the Netflix series, Tires (TV series)
- Joe Hackett, member of the Pennsylvania House of Representatives, District 161 from 2011 to 2015
