= Darby Township, Pennsylvania =

Township in Pennsylvania, US

- First Class Township
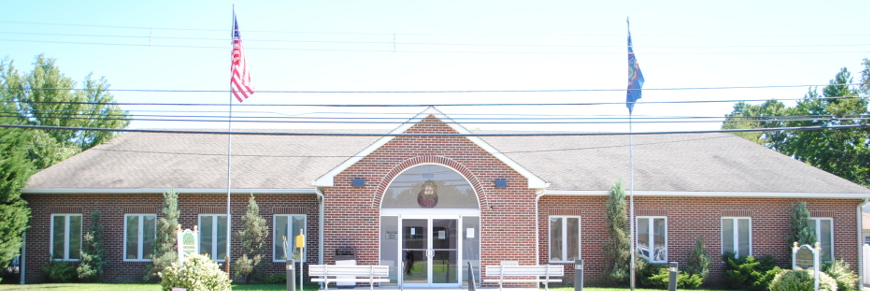
- Darby Township Municipal Building in Darby Township

- Location in Delaware County and the state of Pennsylvania.

- Location of Pennsylvania in the United States
- Coordinates: 39°54′00″N 75°17′29″W
- Country: United States
- State: Pennsylvania
- County: Delaware
- Settled: 1682

Area
  - Total: 1.42 sq mi (3.68 km^{2})
  - Land: 1.42 sq mi (3.67 km^{2})
  - Water: 0.0077 sq mi (0.02 km^{2})
- Elevation: 89 ft (27 m)

Population (2020)
  - Total: 9,219
  - Density: 6,512.7/sq mi (2,514.56/km^{2})
- Time zone: UTC-5 (EST)
  - Summer (DST): UTC-4 (EDT)
- Area code: 610
- FIPS code: 42-045-18160
- Website: www.darbytwp.org

Darby Township is a township in Delaware County, Pennsylvania, United States. The population was 9,219 as of the 2020 census. It is home to both residential areas and expansive industrial districts. Darby Township is home to a diverse population and its industrial districts are popular among shipping companies for their proximity to Philadelphia International Airport. It also is known for being made up of two non-contiguous geographical areas, requiring one to pass through at least two neighboring municipalities to make it from one end of Darby Township to the other. Darby Township is a distinct municipality from the nearby and similarly named Darby Borough and Upper Darby Township.

== History ==
=== Early settlement ===
The area, now known as Darby Township, was settled almost immediately after the coming of William Penn (1682), and in 1683 was recognized as one of the localities where a permanent lodgement had been made but despite that fact, it is believed that the population was sparse for more than a quarter of a century. In 1682, Darby Friends' Meeting had been established. In the same year the first official record of Darby occurs in the list of collectors "to gather the assessment for the building of the court-house". Thomas Worth and Joshua Fearne were appointed to those offices for Darby, and Mons Stacker and William Cobb "for Amosland & Calcoone Hook". The latter was recognized as a distinct municipal district until 1686, when Calcoone Hook was made a part of Darby Township, and Amosland was annexed to Ridley. Calcon or Calkoen's Hook comprised all the territory between Cobb's Creek on the east, and the Mokormpates Kill or Muckinipattas Creek on the west, and derives its name from the Swedish word Kalkon (a turkey) and Walda Kalkoen (wild turkeys). Later the territory known by that name became restricted to that part lying south of the Philadelphia, Wilmington, and Baltimore Railroad, while its eastern boundary was Morhorhootink, as shown in the atlas of the early grants in Delaware County.

=== Division of Upper and Lower Darby ===
The territory now constituting the townships of Upper and Lower Darby continued under one municipal government until 1747, when, for the convenience of the inhabitants, at a town-meeting, it was decided to separate the upper part from the lower in all matters save the levies made for the support of the poor. The lines thus agreed upon are not the township lines now existing, but Upper Darby, being less densely peopled, extended farther south. The inconveniences arising from the unofficial division so frequently presented themselves as a disturbing element in local government that forty years thereafter a petition was presented to the court. The following is an excerpt from this petition:

Beginning at Cobb's Creek on the Northwest side of a tract of land belonging to the heirs of Joshua Ash and in the line of said land, thence along said line and the line of land late Enoch Bonsall's & Joshua Bonsall's to Darby Creek thence down the said Creek to the northwest line of John Ash's land, thence along said line and the line of Samuel Ash and Nathaniel Smith to the line of Ridley Township, and that the lower part may be called Darby and the other part Upper Darby.

== Geography ==
Darby Township is located at 39°54′28″N 75°17′21″W (39.907962, -75.289325).

According to the United States Census Bureau, the township has a total area of 1.4 square miles (3.7 km^{2}), of which 1.4 square miles (3.7 km^{2}) is land and 0.70% is water. The township consists of two separate non-contiguous territories, with incorporated boroughs intervening.

Darby Township borders nine different municipalities: the City of Philadelphia, Sharon Hill Borough, Colwyn Borough, Folcroft Borough, Glenolden Borough, Ridley Township, Upper Darby Township, Aldan Borough, and Collingdale Borough.

== Demographics ==
Historical population
Census	Pop.	Note	%±
1930	2,773		—
1940	2,899		4.5%
1950	3,454		19.1%
1960	12,598		264.7%
1970	13,603		8.0%
1980	12,264		−9.8%
1990	10,955		−10.7%
2000	9,622		−12.2%
2010	9,264		−3.7%
2020	9,219		−0.5%
U.S. Decennial Census

=== 2020 ===
Darby township, Pennsylvania – Racial and ethnic composition Note: the US Census treats Hispanic/Latino as an ethnic category. This table excludes Latinos from the racial categories and assigns them to a separate category. Hispanics/Latinos may be of any race.
Race / Ethnicity (NH = Non-Hispanic)	Pop 2000	Pop 2010	Pop 2020	% 2000	% 2010	2020
White alone (NH)	5,961	5,283	4,461	61.95%	57.03%	48.39%
Black or African American alone (NH)	3,471	3,546	4,043	36.07%	38.28%	43.86%
Native American or Alaska Native alone (NH)	11	9	17	0.11%	0.10%	0.18%
Asian alone (NH)	23	55	103	0.24%	0.59%	1.12%
Pacific Islander alone (NH)	3	2	3	0.03%	0.02%	0.03%
Some Other Race alone (NH)	15	15	51	0.16%	0.16%	0.55%
Mixed Race or Multi-Racial (NH)	52	165	286	0.54%	1.78%	3.10%
Hispanic or Latino (any race)	86	189	255	0.89%	2.04%	2.77%
Total	9,622	9,264	9,219	100.00%	100.00%	100.00%

As of the census of 2010, there were 9,264 people, 3,731 households, and 2,466 families residing in the township. The population density was 6,617.1 inhabitants per square mile (2,554.9/km^{2}). There were 3,926 housing units at an average density of 2,804.3 units per square mile (1,082.7 units/km^{2}). The racial makeup of the township was 57.7% White, 38.9% African American, 0.1% Native American, 0.6% Asian, 0.03% Pacific Islander, 0.4% from other races, and 2.2% from two or more races. 2.0% of the population were Hispanic or Latino of any race.

There were 3,731 households, out of which 28.2% had children under the age of 18 living with them, 36.8% were married couples living together, 23.0% had a female householder with no husband present, and 33.9% were non-families. 28.9% of all households were made up of individuals, and 12.2% had someone living alone who was 65 years of age or older. The average household size was 2.48 and the average family size was 3.07.

In the township the population was spread out, with 24.0% under the age of 18, 8.1% from 18 to 24, 15.0% from 25 to 34, 17.5% from 35 to 49, 19.9% from 50 to 64, and 15.5% who were 65 years of age or older. The median age was 37.4 years. For every 100 females, there were 85.9 males. For every 100 females age 18 and over, there were 79.4 males.

The median income for a household in the township was $37,396, and the median income for a family was $43,357. Males had a median income of $36,259 versus $29,711 for females. The per capita income for the township was $17,179. About 10.7% of families and 11.8% of the population were below the poverty line, including 18.9% of those under age 18 and 11.8% of those age 65 or over.

== Transportation ==
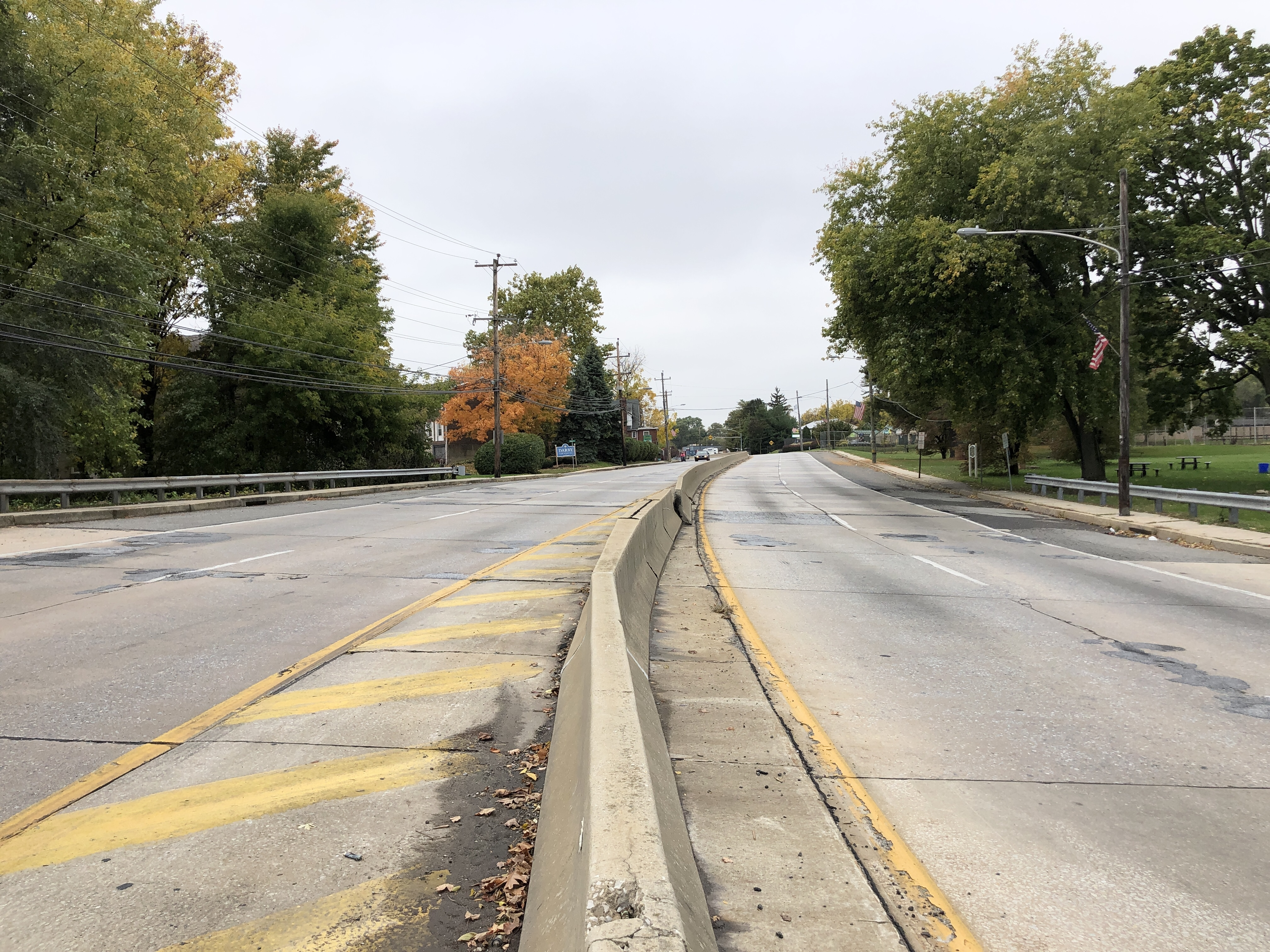
Hook Road westbound in Darby Township

As of 2018, there were 16.52 miles (26.59 km) of public roads in Darby Township, of which 2.20 miles (3.54 km) were maintained by Pennsylvania Department of Transportation (PennDOT) and 14.32 miles (23.05 km) were maintained by the township.

No numbered highways traverse Darby Township. Main thoroughfares include Hook Road in the southeastern portion of the township and Oak Lane in the northwestern portion.

SEPTA provides Suburban Bus service to Darby Township along Route 107, which runs between Lawrence Park and the 69th Street Transportation Center, Route 113, which runs between Claymont station in Claymont, Delaware, and the 69th Street Transportation Center, and Route 115, which runs between Delaware County Community College, the Darby Transportation Center, and the Philadelphia International Airport.

== Government ==
Darby Township is a First Class Township. It employs the Council-Manager form of government. The Assistant township manager is Matthew Judge. The council is the Board of Commissioners, which consists of five Commissioners, each representing a different Ward. The 1st and 2nd Wards are located in the southern part of the Township. The 1st Ward is represented by Racquel Holman (D). The 2nd Ward is represented by Rickard Womack (D). Womack serves as President of the Board of Commissioners. The 3rd, 4th, and 5th Wards are located in the northern part of the Township. The 3rd Ward is represented by Joseph DiLuzio (R). DiLuzio serves as Vice President of the Board of Commissioners. The 4th Ward is represented by Thomas Orlando (R). The 5th Ward is represented by Robert Gougler (R).

The Township Tax Collector is Barry Merlino (R) and the Township Controller is Paul Strus (R). The district judge for Darby Township is Judge Steven A. Sandone, Esq.

The U.S. Senators currently serving from Pennsylvania are Sen. Bob Casey Jr. (D) and Sen. John Fetterman (D).

Darby Township is in the 5th District of Pennsylvania in the U.S. House of Representatives. The 5th District is represented by Rep. Mary Gay Scanlon (D).

Darby Township is in the 8th District for the Pennsylvania State Senate in the Pennsylvania General Assembly. The 8th District is represented by State Sen. Anthony Hardy Williams (D). Darby Township is spread over the 162nd and 185th Districts for the Pennsylvania House of Representatives in the Pennsylvania General Assembly. The 162nd District is represented by Rep. David M Delloso (D). The 185th District is represented by Rep. Maria P Doantucci (D).

== Education ==
Darby Township is serviced by Southeast Delco School District. Students living in Darby Township first attend the Kindergarten Center, which is located in Darby Township. Most students attend Darby Township School, which is also located in Darby Township, for grades 1–8; some are zoned to Delcroft School in Folcroft and Sharon Hill School in Sharon Hill. For high school, students attend Academy Park High School, which is located in Sharon Hill Borough.

Darby Township is home to two public libraries. The Lee Taliaferro Library is located on Hook Road, and the Loretta Touni Library is located on Garfield Ave.

== Fire companies ==
Darby Township and its neighboring communities are protected by three volunteer fire companies. Two of these companies are located in the northern end of Darby Township. The Briarcliffe Fire Company consists of two engines, one ambulance and one utility vehicle. Goodwill Fire Company is also located in the northern end of Darby Township. It consists of one ladder, one pumper, one mini-pumper, and one transport utility vehicle. Darby Township Fire Company No. 4 is located in the southern end of Darby Township, and it consists of two firetrucks and one pickup truck.

The Briarcliffe Fire company fire was temporarily shut down following allegations of racist remarks by firefighters who thought their video call conversation was private.

Preceded by Folcroft	Bordering communities of Philadelphia	Succeeded by Colwyn
