= Folcroft, Pennsylvania =

Borough in Pennsylvania, US

- Borough
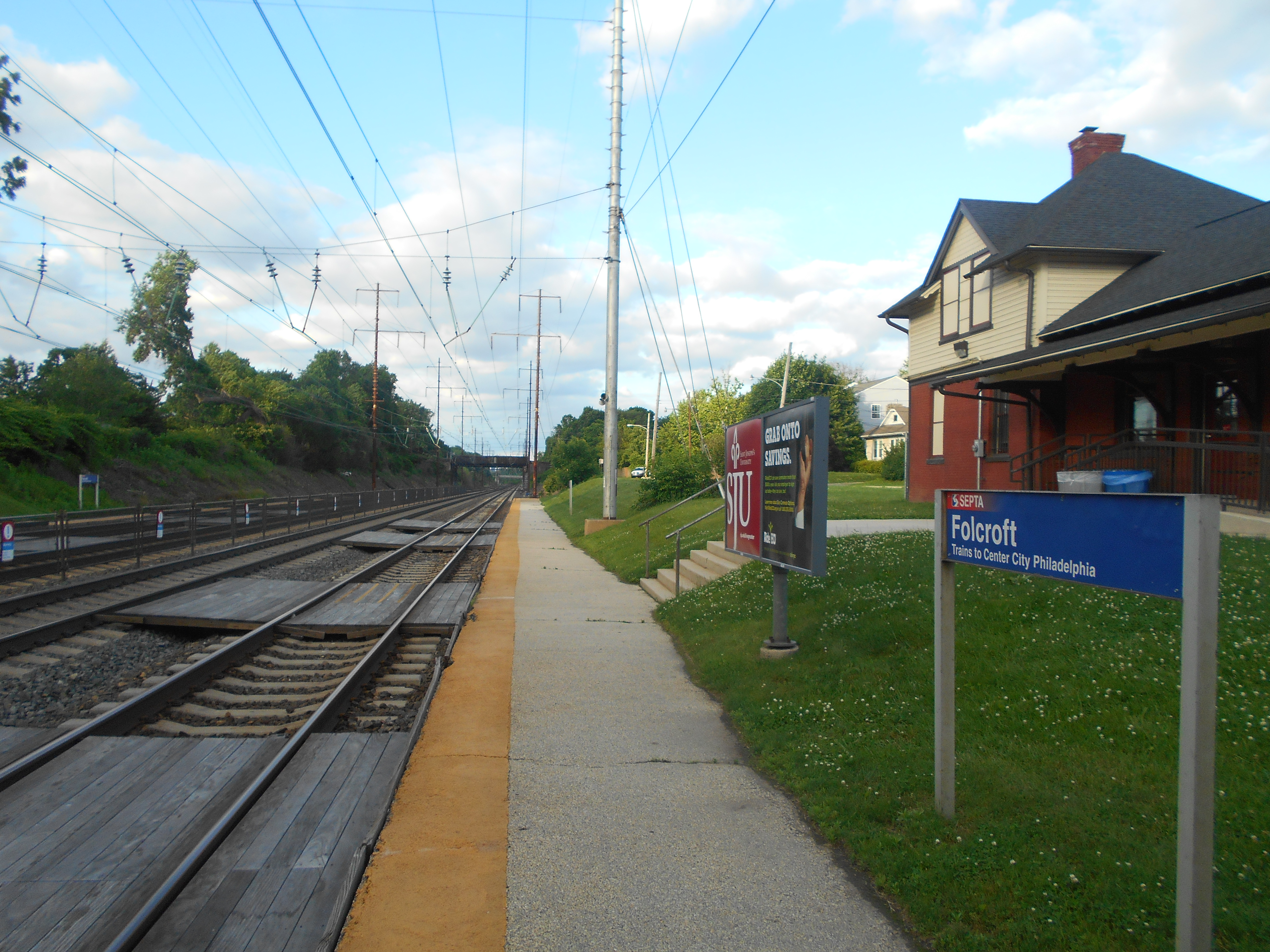
- Folcroft Station

- Location in Delaware County and the U.S. state of Pennsylvania.

- Location of Folcroft in Pennsylvania Folcroft (the United States)
- Coordinates: 39°53′36″N 75°16′51″W
- Country: United States
- State: Pennsylvania
- County: Delaware

Area
  - Total: 1.42 sq mi (3.68 km^{2})
  - Land: 1.25 sq mi (3.23 km^{2})
  - Water: 0.18 sq mi (0.46 km^{2})
- Elevation: 33 ft (10 m)

Population (2020)
  - Total: 6,792
  - Density: 5,454.2/sq mi (2,105.89/km^{2})
- Time zone: UTC-5 (EST)
  - Summer (DST): UTC-4 (EDT)
- ZIP code: 19032
- Area codes: 610 and 484
- FIPS code: 42-26408
- Website: www.folcroftborough.com

Folcroft is a borough in Delaware County, Pennsylvania, United States. As of the 2020 census, Folcroft had a population of 6,792.

== History ==
The origin of Folcroft can be traced back to the mid 1600s and early settlements of New Sweden. Delmar Drive was once part of Calcon Hook Road. Calcon is the Swedish word for "turkey", and Hook is the Swedish word for "road". The original road was a Leni Lenape trail called "Turkey's Neck Trail" by the settlers, and was no more than 4 feet (1.2 m) wide.

Originally productive farmlands, it became a residential suburb of Philadelphia with the construction of the Pennsylvania Railroad through the area in 1874. A passenger stop was built and named Folcroft, or "leafy fields". Originally part of Darby Township, Folcroft was incorporated as a borough in 1922.

Reverend Richard Allen, founder of Bethel AME Church in Philadelphia, owned a home in then Darby Township in 1808.(Delaware County Deed Book L for 1808, pages 527-529)

In August 1963, the Baker family became the first African-American family to purchase a house in Folcroft in the Delmar village complex. When local white residents learned of the purchase, the house was vandalized and a crowd of over a thousand people prevented the Baker family from entering their home. 100 Pennsylvania State Troopers were required to control the crowd and allow the Bakers to enter their home. The harassment and vandalism continued and forced the Bakers to sell the home and move in 1966.

In July 2020 during the COVID-19 pandemic, Folcroft became the first municipality in Delaware County to decriminalize the possession of small amounts of marijuana.

On January 3, 2022, Franny DiCicco was sworn in as the first female Mayor of Folcroft in its 100 year history. The incoming Mayor won election along with Democratic candidates in a clean sweep of the open seats of the borough on Election Day 2021.

== Geography ==
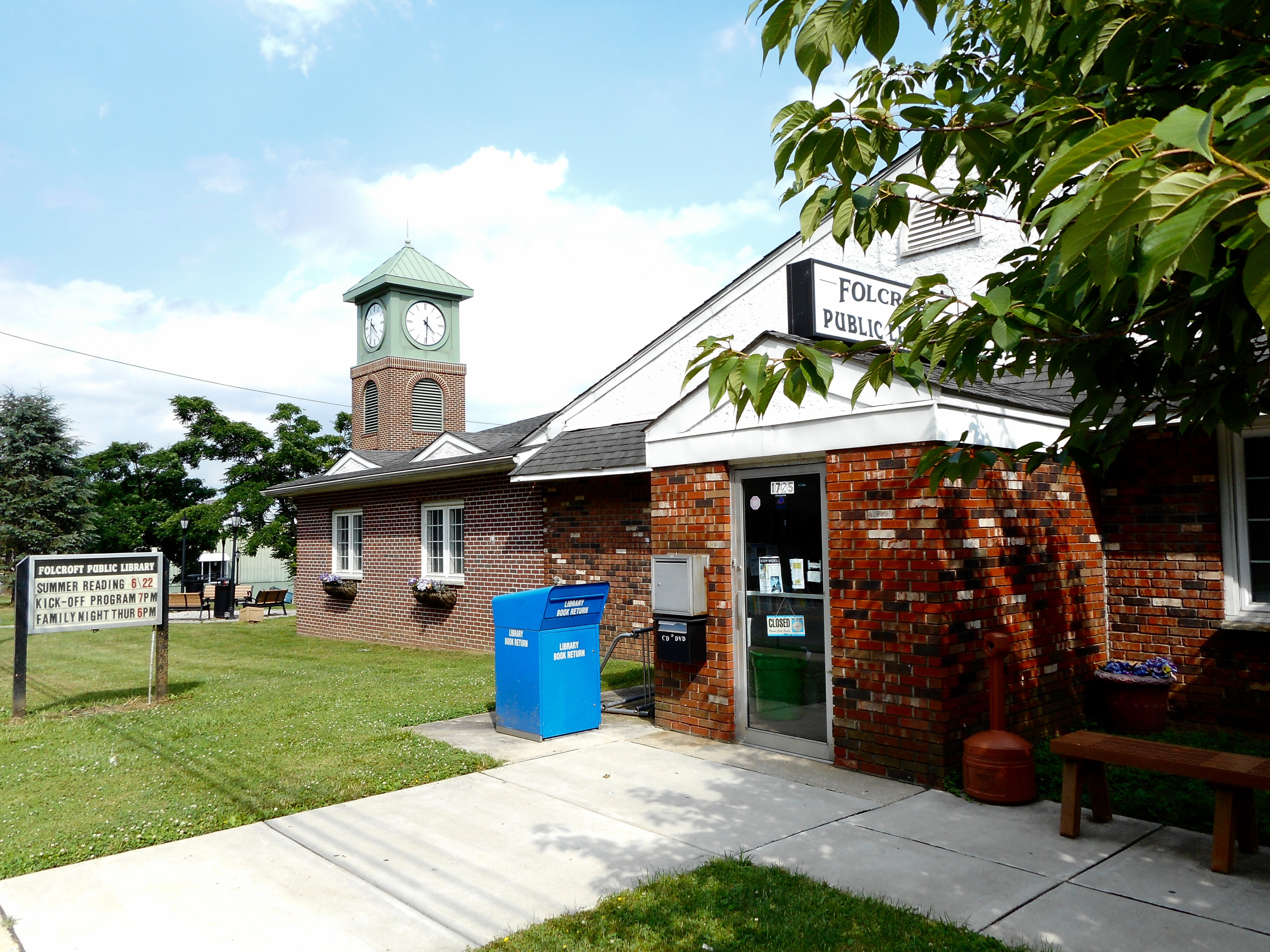
Folcroft Public Library

Folcroft is located in southeastern Delaware County at 39°53′36″N 75°16′51″W (39.893212, -75.280881). It is bordered to the south by Darby Creek and to the west by its tributary, Muckinipattis Creek. To the south across Darby Creek is Tinicum Township. Neighboring boroughs are Norwood to the west, Glenolden to the northwest, Collingdale to the north, and Sharon Hill to the northeast. Darby Township is also to the northeast, and the city of Philadelphia is to the east, across Darby Creek.

According to the United States Census Bureau, Folcroft has a total area of 1.4 square miles (3.7 km^{2}), of which 1.2 square miles (3.2 km^{2}) is land and 0.2 square miles (0.5 km^{2}), or 12.38%, is water.

Folcroft Station is a stop on the Wilmington/Newark Line of the SEPTA Regional Rail commuter railroad system.

=== Climate ===
The climate in this area is characterized by hot, humid summers and generally mild to cool winters. According to the Köppen Climate Classification system, Folcroft has a humid subtropical climate, abbreviated "Cfa" on climate maps. The borough straddles the boundary between hardiness zones 7a and 7b. Interactive Map | USDA Plant Hardiness Zone Map

== Demographics ==
Historical population
Census	Pop.	Note	%±
1930	1,432		—
1940	1,592		11.2%
1950	1,909		19.9%
1960	7,013		267.4%
1970	9,610		37.0%
1980	8,231		−14.3%
1990	7,506		−8.8%
2000	6,978		−7.0%
2010	6,606		−5.3%
2020	6,792		2.8%

According to the most recent 2019 ACS, the racial makeup composition of Folcroft was 55.21% White, 39.32% Black or African American, 1.90% Asian, and 2.76% two or more races. Folcroft has a growing Hispanic and African population in recent years. Origin of naturalized citizens are 61% African, 12% Asian and 6.6% Latin American.

As of Census 2010, the racial makeup of the borough was 67.1% White, 26.0% African American, 0.3% Native American, 2.9% Asian, 1.4% from other races, and 2.4% from two or more races. Hispanic or Latino of any race were 4.6% of the population.

As of the census of 2000, there were 6,978 people, 2,530 households, and 1,862 families residing in the borough. The population density was 5,151.6 inhabitants per square mile (1,989.0/km^{2}). There were 2,629 housing units at an average density of 1,940.9 per square mile (749.4/km^{2}). The racial makeup of the borough was 93.1% White, 4.0% African American, 0.09% Native American, 0.95% Asian, 0.03% Pacific Islander, 0.29% from other races, and 0.80% from two or more races. Hispanic or Latino of any race were 1.10% of the population.

There were 2,530 households, out of which 34.3% had children under the age of 18 living with them, 52.6% were married couples living together, 15.5% had a female householder with no husband present, and 26.4% were non-families. 22.3% of all households were made up of individuals, and 10.0% had someone living alone who was 65 years of age or older. The average household size was 2.76 and the average family size was 3.24.

In the borough the population was spread out, with 26.8% under the age of 18, 8.1% from 18 to 24, 30.5% from 25 to 44, 21.3% from 45 to 64, and 13.4% who were 65 years of age or older. The median age was 36 years. For every 100 females there were 95.8 males. For every 100 females age 18 and over, there were 90.7 males.

The median income for a household in the borough was $44,443, and the median income for a family was $50,791. Males had a median income of $38,105 versus $27,098 for females. The per capita income for the borough was $17,727. About 7.8% of families and 8.4% of the population were below the poverty line, including 8.2% of those under age 18 and 10.7% of those age 65 or over.

== Transportation ==
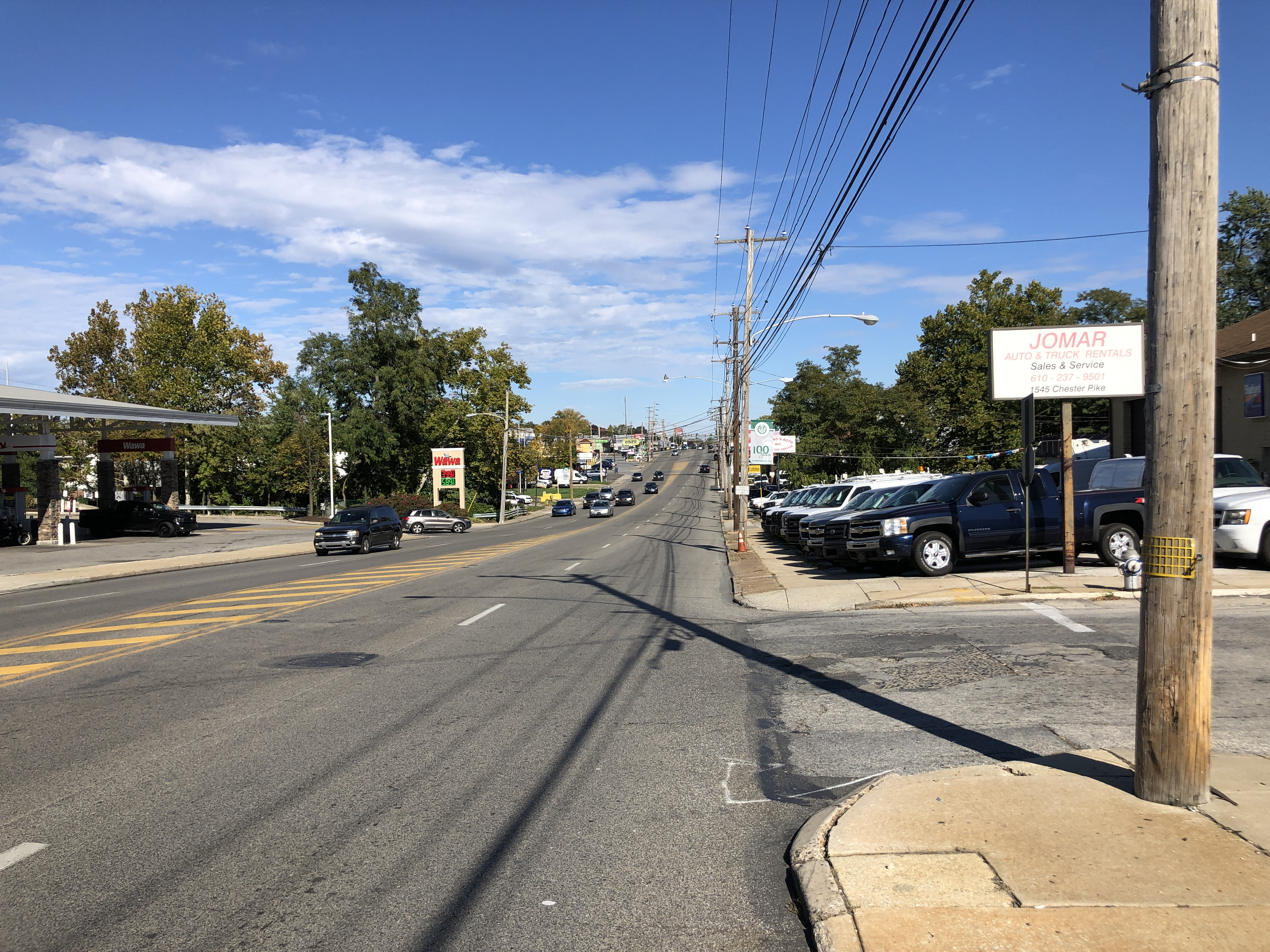
US 13 northbound in Folcroft

As of 2008, there were 10.76 miles (17.32 km) of public roads in Folcroft, of which 1.19 miles (1.92 km) were maintained by the Pennsylvania Department of Transportation (PennDOT) and 9.57 miles (15.40 km) were maintained by the borough.

U.S. Route 13 is the only numbered highway serving Folcroft. It follows Chester Pike along a southwest-to-northeast alignment across the northwest corner of the borough.

Folcroft Station is a SEPTA train station on the Wilmington/Newark Line.

== Environmental issues ==
Through the grassroots support of local citizens, organizations and politicians, Congress declared Tinicum Marsh along Darby Creek a National Wildlife Refuge in 1972. The John Heinz National Wildlife Refuge at Tinicum is just one of over 530 national wildlife refuges managed by the United States Fish and Wildlife Service. In the shadow of Philadelphia, visitors can watch pintail ducks feeding, red-bellied turtles basking, butterflies flitting, and foxes play. With just 1,200 acres (490 ha) of marshes, fields, streams and forests, the refuge is small in area but significant biologically. Tinicum's Marshes, along with other wetlands in the Delaware estuary, are the nursery for commercial and sport fisheries along the Delaware River, Delaware Bay, and the Atlantic Ocean.

The U.S. Environmental Protection Agency placed the Lower Darby Creek Area on the National Priorities List in June 2001. The site consists of two landfills: the Clearview Landfill and the Folcroft Landfill and Annex. EPA held a meeting in September 2001 to inform the community that the Lower Darby Creek Area is now a Superfund site.

The Lower Darby Creek Area site consists of two landfills, the Clearview Landfill and the Folcroft Landfill and Annex, along Darby Creek in Philadelphia and Delaware counties. Clearview Landfill is on the east side of Darby Creek, and about 2 miles (3 km) downstream is the Folcroft Landfill/Annex on the west side of Darby Creek. The Folcroft Landfill/Annex is part of the John Heinz National Wildlife Refuge and managed by the United States Fish and Wildlife Service. The two landfills operated from the 1950s to the 1970s and were eventually closed in the mid-1970s. During operation they disposed of a variety of waste including municipal, demolition, and hospital waste.

The U.S. Fish and Wildlife Service owns the Folcroft Landfill/Annex and, accordingly, they will have the lead on cleaning it up. Presently, EPA is in discussions with potentially responsible parties to form a group to perform the RI/FS at the Folcroft Landfill/Annex.

== Media ==
Trinity Broadcasting Network's Delaware Valley area station, WGTW-TV (Channel 48), broadcasts from studios on Columbia Avenue.

== Education ==
Southeast Delco School District operates public schools for the municipality. Most K-8 school residents in Folcroft are zoned to Delcroft School, while some are zoned to Sharon Hill School. All residents of the school district are zoned to Academy Park High School.

Preceded by Tinicum Township	Bordering communities of Philadelphia	Succeeded by Darby Township
