= Sharon Hill, Pennsylvania =

Borough in Pennsylvania, US

- Borough
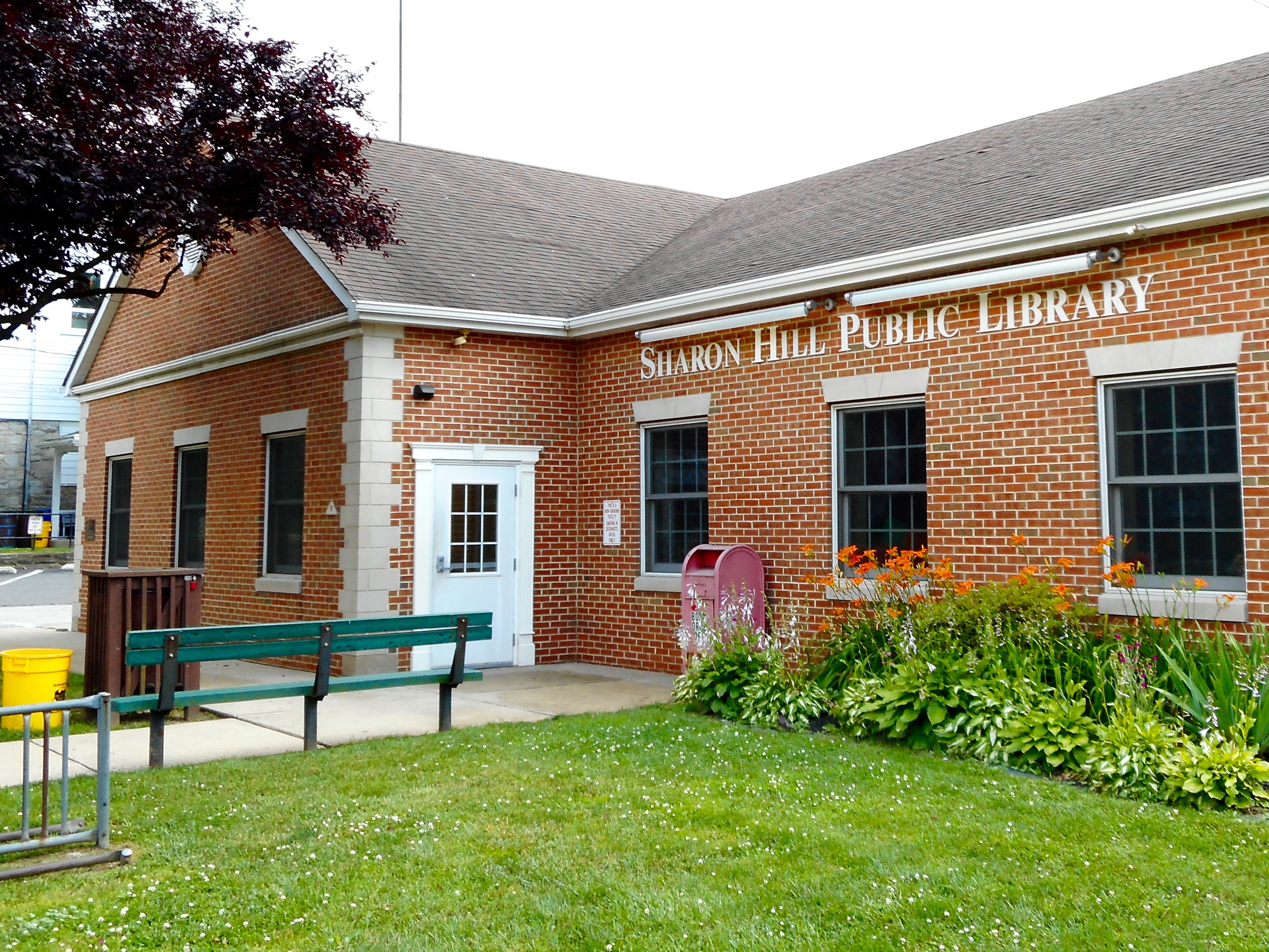
- Sharon Hill Public Library

- Location in Delaware County and the U.S. state of Pennsylvania.

- Location of Sharon Hill in Pennsylvania Sharon Hill (the United States)
- Coordinates: 39°54′23″N 75°16′16″W
- Country: United States
- State: Pennsylvania
- County: Delaware

Government
  - Mayor: Hykeem Green

Area
  - Total: 0.77 sq mi (2.00 km^{2})
  - Land: 0.77 sq mi (2.00 km^{2})
  - Water: 0 sq mi (0.00 km^{2})
- Elevation: 85 ft (26 m)

Population (2010)
  - Total: 5,697
  - Estimate (2019): 5,689
  - Density: 7,372.3/sq mi (2,846.46/km^{2})
- Time zone: UTC-5 (EST)
  - Summer (DST): UTC-4 (EDT)
- ZIP code: 19079
- Area codes: 610 and 484
- FIPS code: 42-045-69752
- FIPS code: 42-69752
- GNIS feature ID: 1187371
- Website: www.sharonhillboro.com

Sharon Hill is a borough in Delaware County, Pennsylvania, United States. As of the 2020 census, Sharon Hill had a population of 6,014.

== Government ==
The government of Sharon Hill operates under the Pennsylvania State Borough Code. The day-to-day operations of the borough are exercised through the borough manager, Joy Taylor. The mayor is Edward Booker. The borough has seven councilmembers, headed by Tanya Allen.

== Geography ==
Sharon Hill is located in eastern Delaware County at 39°54′23″N 75°16′16″W (39.906340, -75.271008). It is bordered to the west by Folcroft, to the north by Collingdale and Darby, to the east by Colwyn, and to the south by Darby Township.

According to the United States Census Bureau, Sharon Hill has a total area of 0.77 square miles (2.0 km^{2}), all land.

== Demographics ==
Historical population
Census	Pop.	Note	%±
1900	1,058		—
1910	1,401		32.4%
1920	1,780		27.1%
1930	3,825		114.9%
1940	4,467		16.8%
1950	5,464		22.3%
1960	7,123		30.4%
1970	7,464		4.8%
1980	6,221		−16.7%
1990	5,771		−7.2%
2000	5,468		−5.3%
2010	5,697		4.2%
2020	6,014		5.6%

=== 2020 ===
Sharon Hill borough, Pennsylvania – Racial and ethnic composition Note: the US Census treats Hispanic/Latino as an ethnic category. This table excludes Latinos from the racial categories and assigns them to a separate category. Hispanics/Latinos may be of any race.
Race / Ethnicity (NH = Non-Hispanic)	Pop 2000	Pop 2010	Pop 2020	% 2000	% 2010	2020
White alone (NH)	3,855	1,802	1,136	70.50%	31.63%	18.89%
Black or African American alone (NH)	1,347	3,390	4,203	24.63%	59.51%	69.89%
Native American or Alaska Native alone (NH)	5	15	18	0.09%	0.26%	0.30%
Asian alone (NH)	83	114	137	1.52%	2.00%	2.28%
Native Hawaiian or Pacific Islander alone (NH)	2	1	4	0.04%	0.02%	0.07%
Other race alone (NH)	11	5	34	0.20%	0.09%	0.57%
Mixed race or Multiracial (NH)	107	187	231	1.96%	3.28%	3.84%
Hispanic or Latino (any race)	58	183	251	1.06%	3.21%	4.17%
Total	5,468	5,697	6,014	100.00%	100.00%	100.00%

As of Census 2010, the racial makeup of the borough was 32.6% White, 60.6% African American, 0.3% Native American, 2.1% Asian, 0.7% from other races, and 3.7% from two or more races. Hispanic or Latino of any race were 3.2% of the population .

As of the census of 2000, there were 5,697 people, 2,186 households, and 1,390 families residing in the borough. The population density was 7,379.5 inhabitants per square mile (2,849.2/km^{2}). There were 2,265 housing units at an average density of 2,954.0 units per square mile (1,140.5 units/km^{2}). The racial makeup of the borough was 32.6% White, 60.6% African American, 0.3% Native American, 2.1% Asian, 0.00% Pacific Islander, 0.0% from other races, and 3.7% from two or more races. Hispanic or Latino of any race were 3.2% of the population.

There were 2,091 households, out of which 34.0% had children under the age of 18 living with them, 42.7% were married couples living together, 17.4% had a female householder with no husband present, and 33.5% were non-families. 28.7% of all households were made up of individuals, and 10.9% had someone living alone who was 65 years of age or older. The average household size was 2.61 and the average family size was 3.24.

In the borough the population was spread out, with 27.9% under the age of 18, 8.3% from 18 to 24, 31.3% from 25 to 44, 19.9% from 45 to 64, and 12.7% who were 65 years of age or older. The median age was 36 years. For every 100 females there were 89.9 males. For every 100 females age 18 and over, there were 84.3 males.

The median income for a household in the borough was $42,436, and the median income for a family was $48,146. Males had a median income of $37,500 versus $29,049 for females. The per capita income for the borough was $18,503. About 10.6% of families and 11.0% of the population were below the poverty line, including 17.8% of those under age 18 and 3.2% of those age 65 or over.

== Education ==
Students are in the Southeast Delco School District. K-8 school residents in Sharon Hill are zoned to Sharon Hill School. All residents of the school district are zoned to Academy Park High School.

Until 2003, Catholic school students attended Holy Spirit School. This school has since closed due to lack of enrollment. Another Catholic school, Holy Child Academy, closed in 1973.

Delaware County Community College operates the Southeast Center in the Folcroft East Business Park.

== Religion ==
The Roman Catholic Archdiocese of Philadelphia operates Catholic churches. Established in 1892, Holy Spirit Church closed in 2015, consolidating into St. George Church in Glenolden.

== Notable people ==
- Rodney Blake - Professional basketball player
- William Clothier, 1906 U.S. Open champion inducted in International Tennis Hall of Fame
- Bert Cooper - professional boxer
- Bill Cubit - college football coach
- Jalen Duren - NBA basketball player born in Sharon Hill and lived there until seventh grade, when he moved to Delaware.
- Cardinal John Patrick Foley - Member of the College of Cardinals
- Hannah Clothier Hull (1872-1958), clubwoman, feminist, and pacifist
- William H. Milliken, Jr., U.S. Congressman for Pennsylvania's 7th congressional district from 1959 to 1965
- Bessie Smith - Blues singer is buried at Mount Lawn Cemetery in Sharon Hill. Her grave remained unmarked until August 7, 1970, when a tombstone—paid for by singer Janis Joplin and Juanita Green, who as a child had done housework for Smith—was erected.
- Tammi Terrell - American singer-songwriter, widely known as a star singer for Motown Records during the 1960s, notably for a series of duets with singer Marvin Gaye.

== Transportation ==
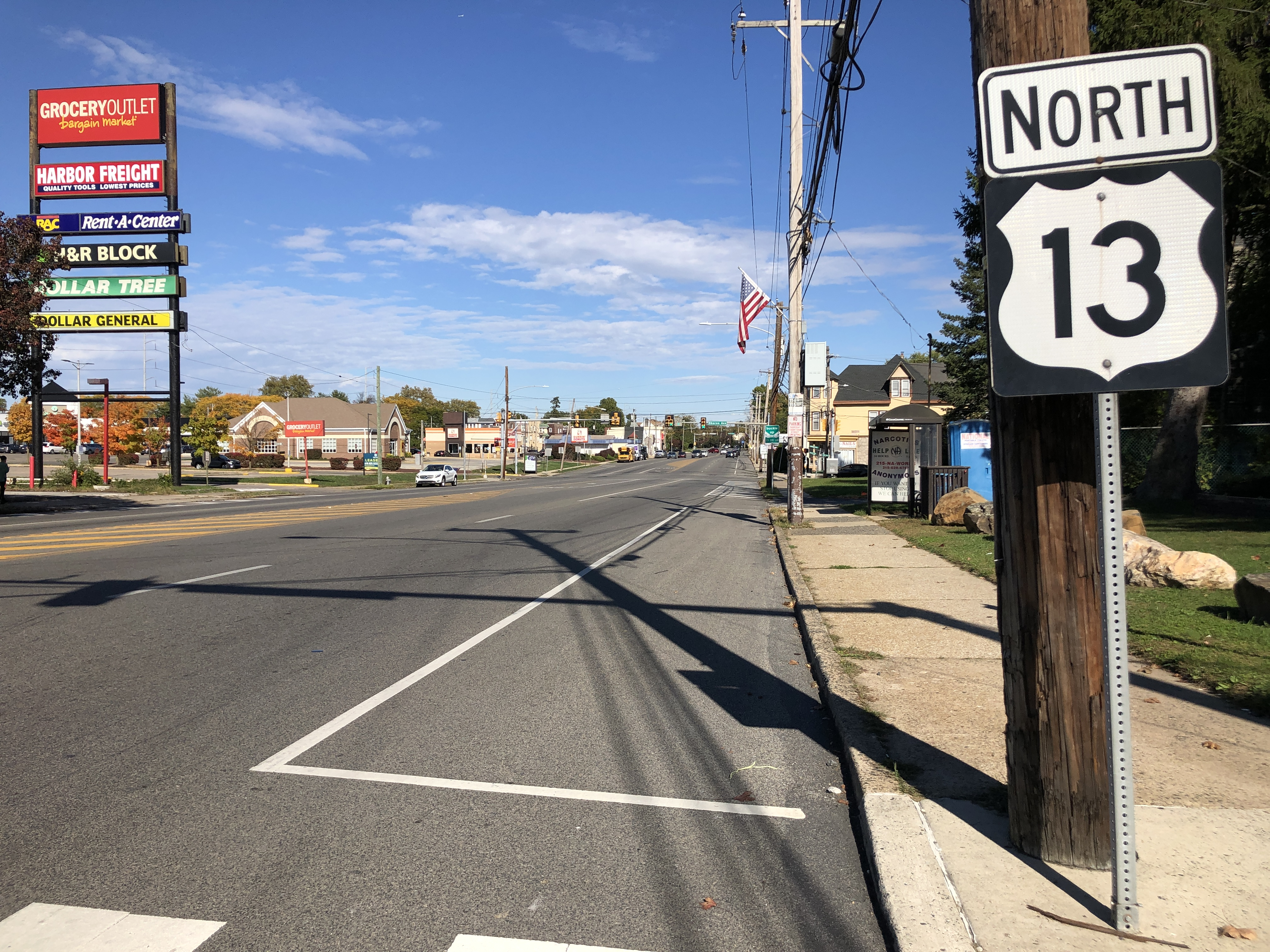
US 13 northbound in Sharon Hill

As of 2008, there were 11.17 miles (17.98 km) of public roads in Sharon Hill, of which 2.14 miles (3.44 km) were maintained by the Pennsylvania Department of Transportation (PennDOT) and 9.03 miles (14.53 km) were maintained by the borough.

U.S. Route 13 (Chester Pike) is the main road through the borough, leading northeast 8 miles (13 km) to Center City Philadelphia and southwest 6 miles (10 km) to Chester.

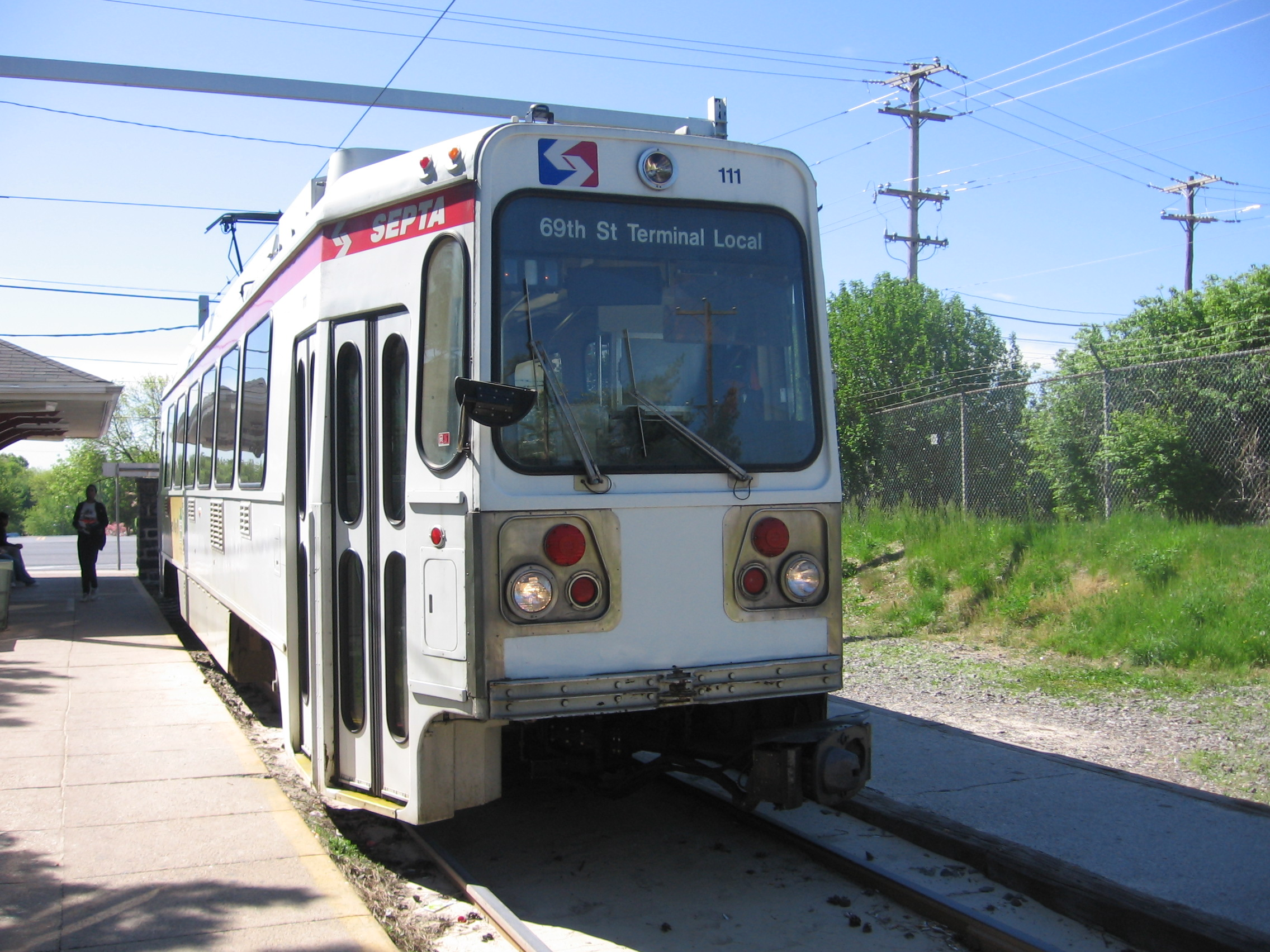
SEPTA D2 streetcar at Sharon Hill station

Sharon Hill is connected to the 69th Street Transportation Center in Upper Darby by the D2, a SEPTA Metro light rail line, at its Sharon Hill terminus. Curtis Park station and Sharon Hill station are SEPTA train stations on the regional rail Wilmington/Newark Line.

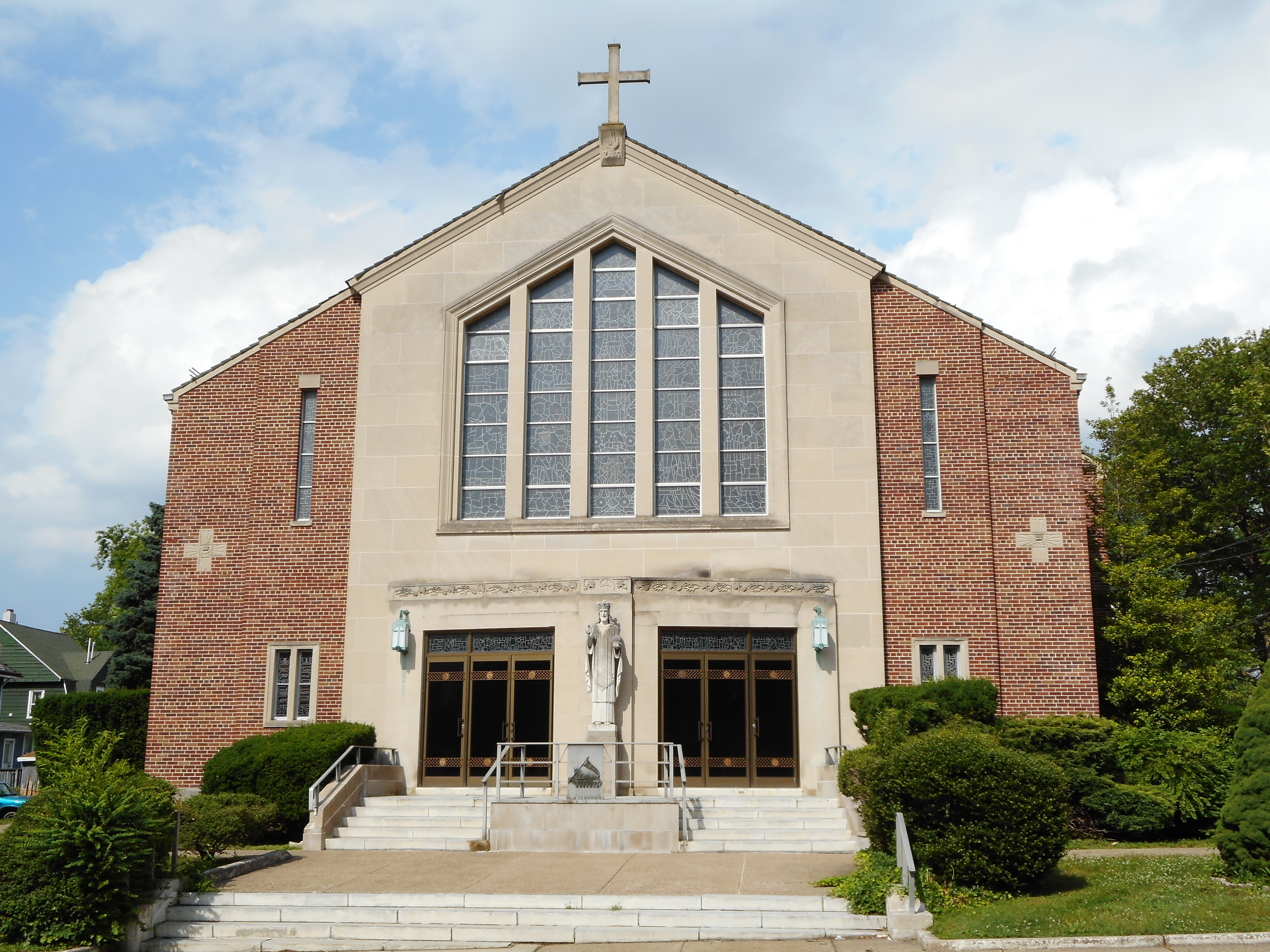
The new Holy Spirit Catholic Church, built in 1960, closed in 2015

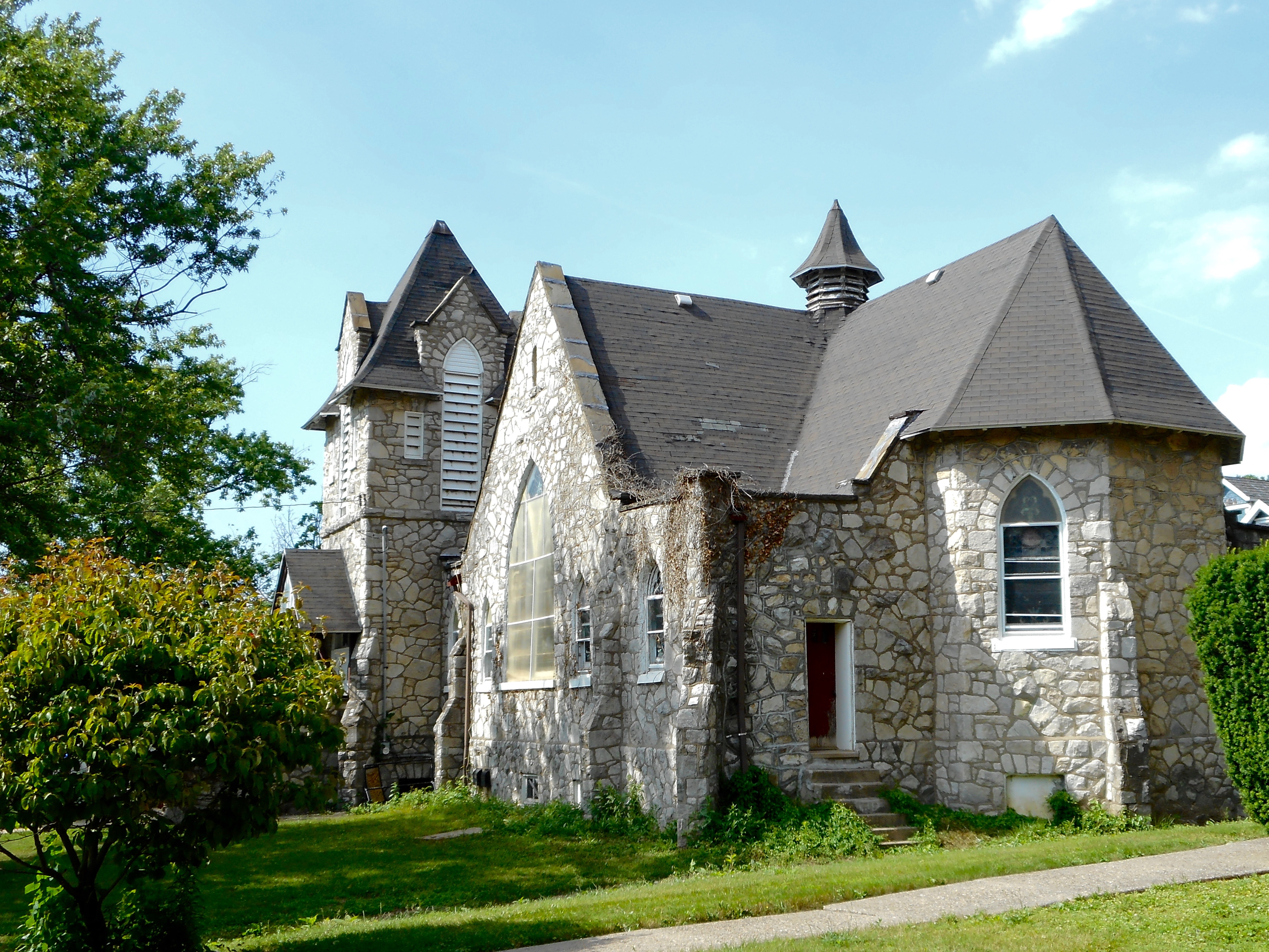
Old church near the 1960 Holy Spirit Catholic Church
