= Colwyn, Pennsylvania =

Borough in Pennsylvania, US

- Borough
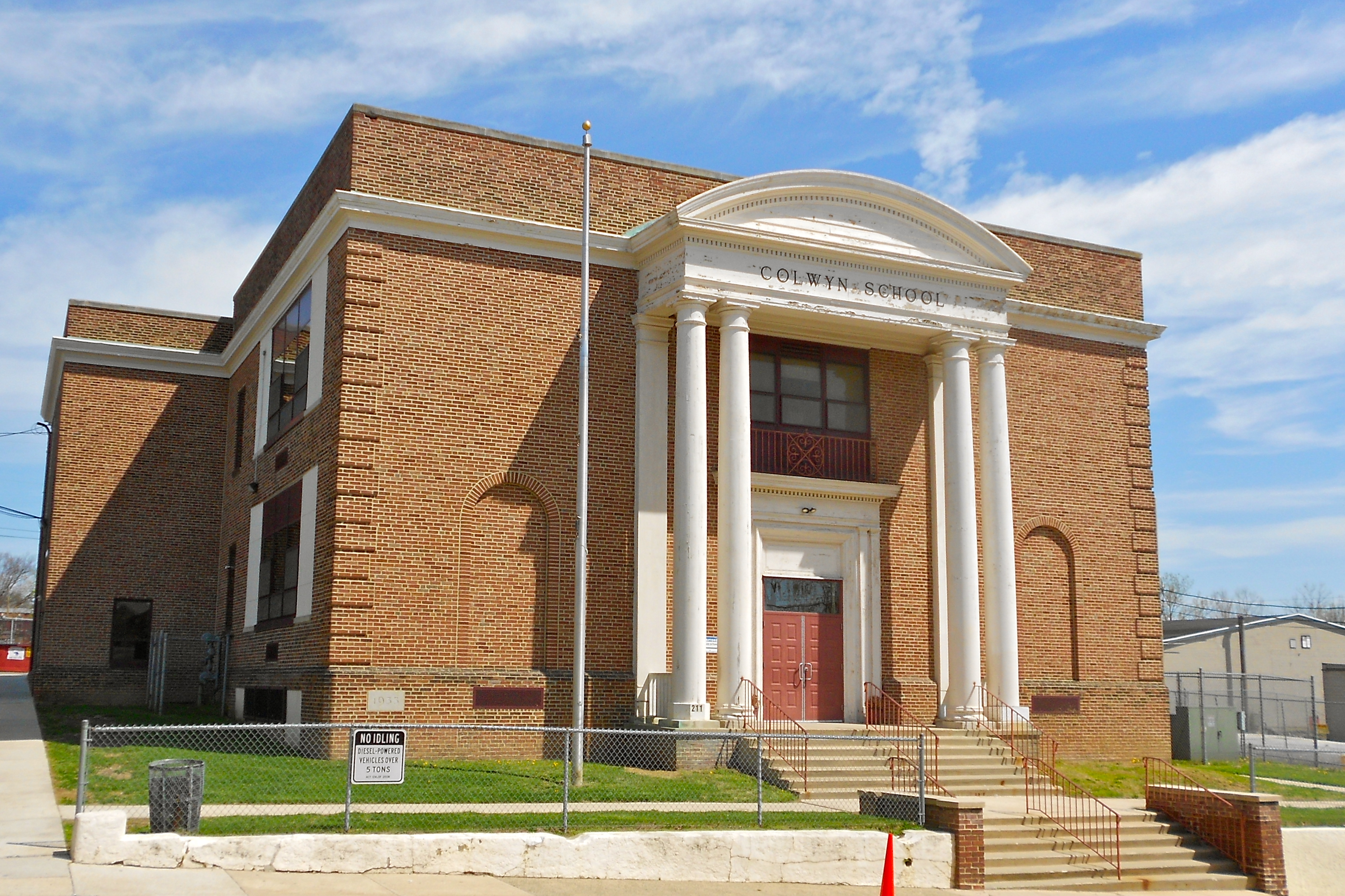
- Colwyn Elementary School

- Location in Delaware County and the U.S. state of Pennsylvania.

- Location of Colwyn in Pennsylvania Colwyn (the United States)
- Coordinates: 39°54′47″N 75°15′12″W
- Country: United States
- State: Pennsylvania
- County: Delaware

Government
  - Mayor: Maurice J. Clark Sr.

Area
  - Total: 0.26 sq mi (0.67 km^{2})
  - Land: 0.26 sq mi (0.67 km^{2})
  - Water: 0 sq mi (0.00 km^{2})
- Elevation: 59 ft (18 m)

Population (2020)
  - Total: 2,474
  - Density: 9,572.0/sq mi (3,695.78/km^{2})
- Time zone: UTC-5 (EST)
  - Summer (DST): UTC-4 (EDT)
- Area code: 610
- FIPS code: 42-15432
- Website: www.colwynborough.com

Colwyn is a borough in Delaware County, Pennsylvania, United States. As of the 2020 census, Colwyn had a population of 2,474.

== Geography ==
Colwyn is located along the eastern border of Delaware County at 39°54′47″N 75°15′12″W (39.913062, -75.253409), where Darby Creek and Cobbs Creek intersect. It is bordered to the north by the borough of Darby, to the west by Sharon Hill, to the south by Darby Township, and to the east by Philadelphia.

According to the U.S. Census Bureau, the borough has a total area of 0.26 square miles (0.67 km^{2}), all land.

== Transportation ==
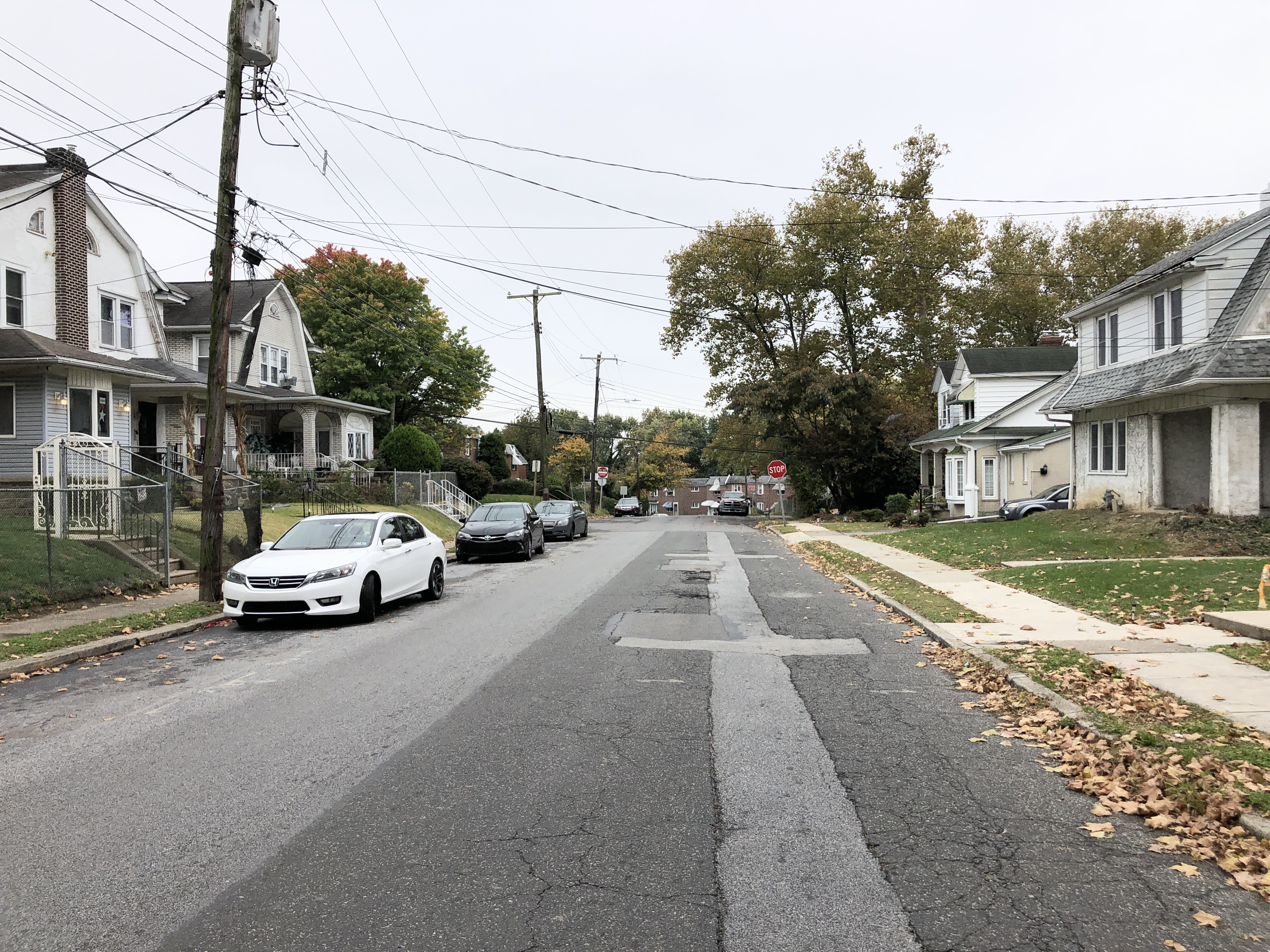
Fourth Street in Colwyn

As of 2008, there were 3.96 miles (6.37 km) of public roads in Colwyn, all of which were maintained by the borough.

No numbered highways serve Colwyn directly. Fourth Street is the longest street within borough limits.

The Darby station on the SEPTA Wilmington/Newark Line is on Pine Street in Darby, just west of the Colwyn border.

== Demographics ==
Historical population
| Census | Pop. | Note | %± |
|---|---|---|---|
| 1900 | 1,226 | | — |
| 1910 | 1,584 | | 29.2% |
| 1920 | 1,859 | | 17.4% |
| 1930 | 2,064 | | 11.0% |
| 1940 | 2,202 | | 6.7% |
| 1950 | 2,143 | | −2.7% |
| 1960 | 3,074 | | 43.4% |
| 1970 | 3,169 | | 3.1% |
| 1980 | 2,841 | | −10.4% |
| 1990 | 2,613 | | −8.0% |
| 2000 | 2,453 | | −6.1% |
| 2010 | 2,546 | | 3.8% |
| 2020 | 2,474 | | −2.8% |

=== 2020 census ===
Colwyn borough, Pennsylvania – Racial and ethnic composition Note: the US Census treats Hispanic/Latino as an ethnic category. This table excludes Latinos from the racial categories and assigns them to a separate category. Hispanics/Latinos may be of any race.
| Race / Ethnicity (NH = Non-Hispanic) | Pop 2000 | Pop 2010 | Pop 2020 | % 2000 | % 2010 | % 2020 |
|---|---|---|---|---|---|---|
| White alone (NH) | 1,041 | 395 | 225 | 42.44% | 15.51% | 9.09% |
| Black or African American alone (NH) | 1,262 | 2,024 | 2,052 | 51.45% | 79.50% | 82.94% |
| Native American or Alaska Native alone (NH) | 3 | 1 | 0 | 0.12% | 0.04% | 0.00% |
| Asian alone (NH) | 24 | 19 | 21 | 0.98% | 0.75% | 0.85% |
| Native Hawaiian or Pacific Islander alone (NH) | 0 | 1 | 0 | 0.00% | 0.04% | 0.00% |
| Other race alone (NH) | 13 | 5 | 0 | 0.53% | 0.20% | 0.00% |
| Mixed race or Multiracial (NH) | 70 | 59 | 114 | 2.85% | 2.32% | 4.61% |
| Hispanic or Latino (any race) | 40 | 42 | 62 | 1.63% | 1.65% | 2.51% |
| Total | 2,453 | 2,546 | 2,474 | 100.00% | 100.00% | 100.00% |

=== 2010 census ===
As of 2010 census, the racial makeup of the borough was 15.9% White, 80.1% African American, 0.7% Asian, 0.6% from other races, and 2.6% from two or more races. Hispanic or Latino of any race were 1.6% of the population. 25.7% of the borough's population was foreign-born, mostly African-born.

== Budgetary disarray ==
The borough government is in financial difficulty. In May 2015, it was declared to be "financially distressed" by the state. With an annual budget of about two million dollars, the borough is more than one million dollars in debt.

The local district attorney has seized financial records, although at least some from 2011, 2012, and 2013 cannot be accounted for.

The local tax rate is very high; press reports indicate it to be five times higher than in richer regional towns. No new buildings have been built in Colwyn since 2007.

== Education ==
William Penn School District serves Colwyn. The district was created in 1972; prior to that year, Colwyn was in the Darby-Colwyn School District.

- Colwyn Elementary School (K-6)
- Penn Wood Middle School (7-8) (Darby)
- Penn Wood High School, Cypress Street Campus (9-10) (Yeadon)
- Penn Wood High School, Green Ave Campus (11-12) (Lansdowne)
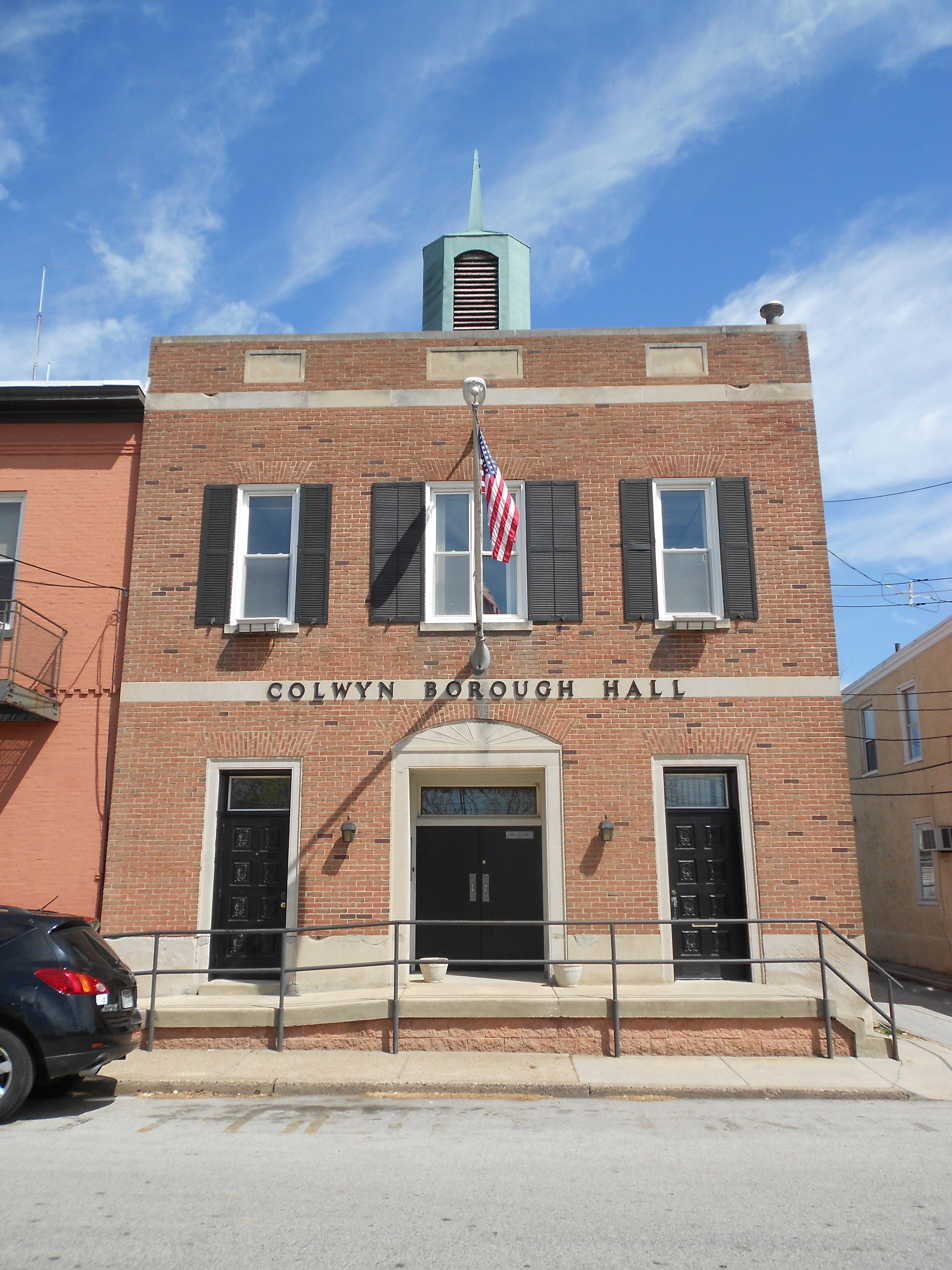
Borough Hall

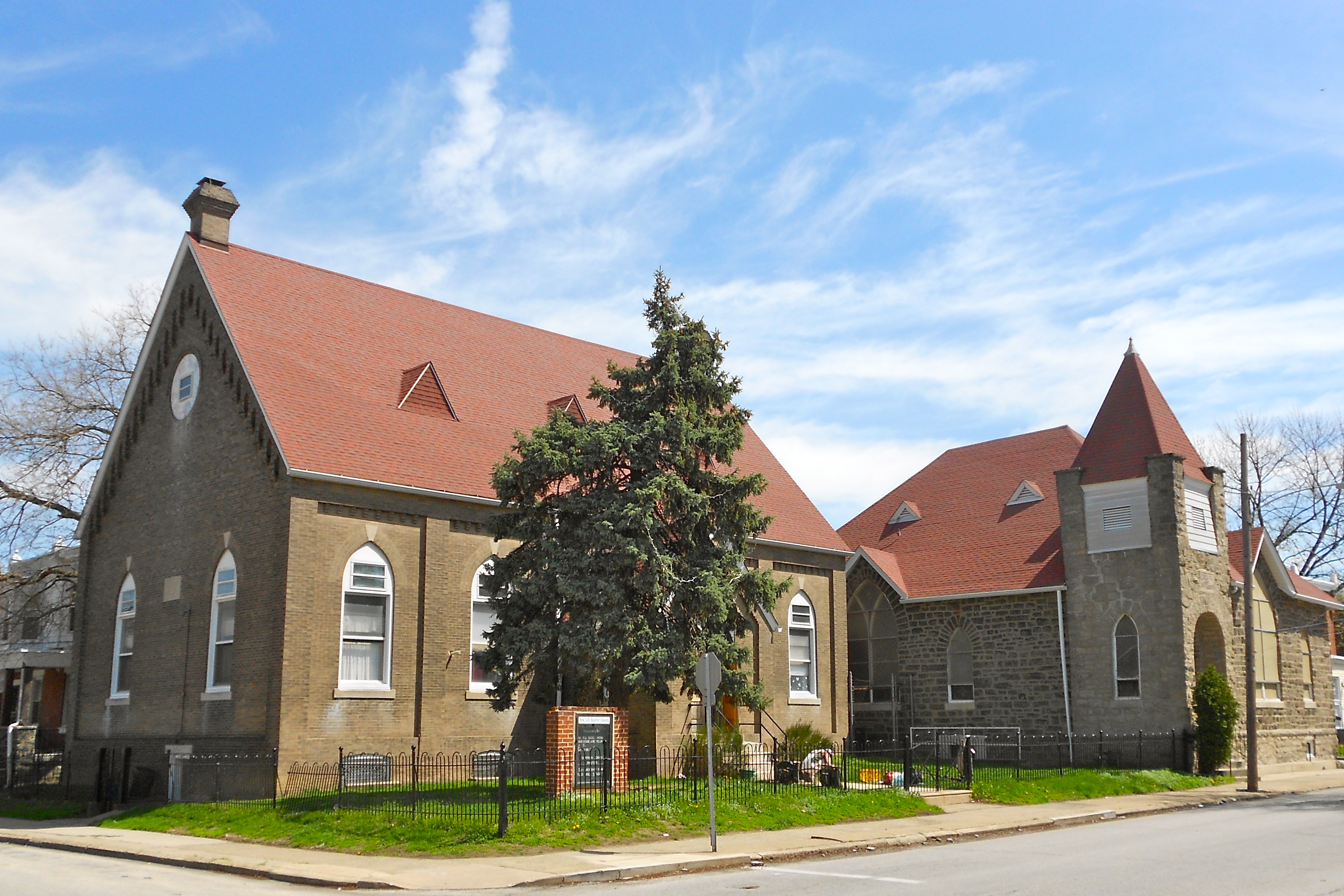
New Life Baptist Church

== Notable person ==
- Alice Neel, visual artist
- Robert Becker, Entertainment Producer

| Preceded by Darby Township | Bordering communities of Philadelphia | Succeeded by Darby |
