= Pennsylvania CareerLink =

Pennsylvania CareerLink is a collaborative project between multiple agencies to provide career services to Pennsylvania employers, potential employees, and others.

Pennsylvania CareerLink is operated under the direction of the Pennsylvania Department of Labor and Industry.

Pennsylvania CareerLink offices and access points are located in each of the 67 Pennsylvania counties. However, not all counties have their own full-fledged Pennsylvania CareerLink office. An example of this is Sullivan County which shares its Pennsylvania CareerLink facility with that of Bradford County.

Most Pennsylvania CareerLink services are offered free of charge.

== What Pennsylvania CareerLink is not ==
While Pennsylvania CareerLink provides employers with employee locating services and functions as an employment agency Pennsylvania CareerLink is not a Temporary Employment Agency nor does it generally perform direct Job Search for the client. Rather the Pennsylvania CareerLink provides tools enabling employers and employees to connect with each other.

== Agencies that compose Pennsylvania CareerLink ==
Pennsylvania CareerLink is and has been composed of numerous partner agencies throughout the Commonwealth of Pennsylvania. because the Counties take bids on who provides Pennsylvania CareerLink service, the agencies which compose a particular Pennsylvania CareerLink may vary extensively from that of another. Further the agencies may vary within a Pennsylvania CareerLink from one contract to another. Commonwealth budget changes in 2005 and 2006 for caused numerous counties to reevaluate their contracts and change providers. They do however have several general features.

A partial list of Agencies which are or have been partnered to form Pennsylvania CareerLink includes:

=== 1. County and Area Workforce Investment Corporations ===
- Montgomery County Workforce Investment Board
- Philadelphia Works
- Educational Data Systems, Inc. (EDSI), a privately held company headquartered in Dearborn, MI, is contracted by various local workforce investment boards throughout the Commonwealth of Pennsylvania to provide workforce development services in several CareerLink sites. Contracts include services to WIA and TANF populations. These contracts were awarded through a competitive RFP process. EDSI currently has contracts in the following counties of Pennsylvania; Philadelphia, Montgomery, Dauphin, Berks, Bucks, Lehigh, Cumberland, Lebanon, Allegheny, Delaware, and York as well as Detroit, MI, Chicago, IL, Manhattan, NY, Prince Georges Co, MD and Washington D.C.
- Harrisburg Area Community College (Dauphin, Cumberland, Lebanon, Adams, Franklin, Juniata, and Perry Counties)
- Southern Alleghenies Planning and Development Commission[www.sapdc.org] (Bedford, Blair, Cambria, Fulton, Huntingdon, and Somerset Counties)
- Employment & Training, Office of Community Services (Allegheny County)
- Pittsburgh Partnership
- Southwest Training Service, Inc (Beaver, Greene, and Washington Counties)
- Job Training for Beaver County
- Tri-County Workforce Investment Board, Inc (Armstrong, Butler, and Indiana Counties)
- Private Industry Council of Westmoreland / Fayette, Inc.
- Regional Center for Workforce Excellence (Clarion, Crawford, Erie, Erie City, Forest, Venango, and Warren Counties)
- West Central Job Partnership Lawrence and Mercer Counties.
- North Central Workforce Investment Board (Cameron, Clearfield, Elk, Jefferson, McKean and Potter Counties)
- Central PA Workforce Development Corporation (Centre, Clinton, Columbia, Lycoming, Mifflin, Montour, Northumberland, Snyder and Union Counties)
- Northern Tier Regional Planning and Development Commission (Bradford, Sullivan, Susquehanna, Tioga, and Wyoming Counties)
- Scranton Lackawanna Human Development Agency, Inc.
- Luzerne County Human Resources Development Department (Luzerne and Schuylkill Counties)
- Pocono Counties Workforce Investment Area (Carbon, Monroe, Pike and Wayne Counties)
- Bucks County Office of Employment & Training, Inc.
- Chester County Department of Community Development
- Delaware County Office of Workforce Development
- Lancaster Employment & Training Agency
- Work Investment Board (Lehigh County and Northampton).

== Services provided by Pennsylvania CareerLink ==
Pennsylvania CareerLink provides its clients with a number of features, which may vary somewhat from county to county.

=== Employment Assistance ===
Pennsylvania CareerLinks are also staffed by Labor & Industry's Bureau of Workforce Development Partnership. In this capacity Pennsylvania CareerLink provides a number of different services designed to link employers and job seekers, including workshops, TRA/TAA, veterans services, unemployment compensation, Business Service Teams and Employer Consortium groups.

==== Services offered in this capacity ====
1. Employers are able to provide lists of job orders
2. Employees can search through these job orders to find jobs of interest to them.
3. Employees may also post their résumé in an online form.
4. Employers can then match job openings to potential employees on the basis of their résumés.
5. Many employers can receive job applications directly through the Pennsylvania CareerLink website.
6. Pennsylvania CareerLink often offers Job Fairs designed to connect large numbers of employers and potential employees.
7. Pennsylvania CareerLink offices frequently serve a s neutral location for employees to gain information about and meet with potential employers.
8. Pennsylvania CareerLink acts as an access point for the Pennsylvania State Civil Service Commission

=== Training and Education ===
Pennsylvania CareerLink offers a number of services that provide citizens of Pennsylvania opportunities for education.

1. The Local Workforce Investment Area (LWIA) provides individualized services to assist people in obtaining and maintaining satisfactory employment. A LWIA counselor can assist the client in the selection of training and/or employment goal(s) and in developing a job seeking strategy. Included in this is the location of funds or funding related to seeking training beyond the high school level.
2. In addition many Pennsylvania CareerLink locations offer classes that help students prepare to take the General Educational Development (GED) test battery, in addition to assessing their educational needs and barriers.
3. Most Pennsylvania CareerLink locations offer Adult Basic Education (ABE) classes designed to teach the client new skill and abilities which may be of aid in the workforce.

=== Youth Services ===
Pennsylvania CareerLink, through its partnering agencies, provides services for young persons seeking to gain experience and enter the labor market, often for the first time. Services provided are extended to both in-school and out-of-school youth and are designed not only to support employment opportunities but also to encourage high school graduation and post-secondary education. Youth services are provided under the guidelines of the 1998 Workforce Investment Act (WIA).

Youth services include intensive and personalized case management that is designed to result in job placement. Case management continues with the client for a one-year follow-up period.

==== Youth Services provided ====
Youth services provided include:

===== In-School Youth Services =====
1. Assessment
2. Case Management
3. Service Plans
4. Drop-Out Prevention
5. Supportive Services
6. Adult Mentoring
7. Leadership Development
8. Career Awareness
9. Career Exploration
10. Occupational Learning
11. Job Shadowing
12. Internships
13. Work Experience
14. Occupational Skills Training
15. Follow-up Services

===== Out-of-School Youth Services =====
1. Assessment
2. Case Management
3. Service Plans
4. Supportive Services
5. Leadership Development
6. GED Preparation
7. Academic Enrichment
8. Career Awareness
9. Career Exploration
10. Labor Market Information
11. Occupational Learning
12. Employability Skills
13. On-the-Job Training
14. Occupational Skills Training
15. Job Search Assistance
16. Follow-up Services

=== OVR ===
Pennsylvania CareerLink serves as an access point for the Office of Vocational Rehabilitation. The OVR helps disabled Pennsylvanians pursue, obtain, and retain employment. This includes supplying funding for training if the nature of their disability precludes continued employment in the original field of employment, or if additional education would be required to secure employment initially.

=== Center for Workforce Information and Analysis ===
Gathers information on the Pennsylvania labor market, including services which may be needed for customers to make reasoned choices. Statistics gathered include education, employer, income, industry, labor force, population, wages, and occupation.

=== Welfare Services ===
Pennsylvania CareerLink operates a number of services for the Pennsylvania Department of Public Welfare. Among these is the EARN program, which is designed to address the needs of welfare recipients in regard to their barriers to employment and employability. This program was previously known as SPOC and is often still referred to by this designation. SPOC programs persist in some other states.

EARN offers a wide range of activities and services though the scope of these services is substantially reduced from that of the Original SPOC services. EARN is focused primarily on Paid Work Experience (PWE) placement however other activities may include adult literacy, driver's training, English as a Second Language training (ESL), GED, life skill instruction, job readiness, and occupational skill training. In addition to job search, job placement, and job retention services. EARN involves intensive personal case management including the creation of individualized plans, and goal setting aimed at helping the individual toward career readiness.

=== Unemployment Compensation ===
Pennsylvania CareerLink serves as a contact point for the Office of Unemployment Compensation. Unemployment representatives within Pennsylvania CareerLink offices provide a direct connection to the Office through which applications for unemployment benefits can be completed and additional information can be gathered. These representatives are available usually by appointment only. This service began in July 2022 and may not be a permanent situation. Call your local office for more information. UC phones were shut down in PA CareerLink offices in March 2020 and have not been reinstated as of this time.

==== Self-employment Assistance ====
The Self-employment Assistance (SEA) program is operated under the auspices of the Pennsylvania Department of Labor and Industry. It is particularly available to individuals who are eligible for Unemployment Compensation and who meet additional criteria who are interested in becoming self-employed.

Services clients receive in the SEA Program involve at least 15 hours of individual business counseling, at least 20 hours of business training, and technical assistance. The SEA client receives a SEA allowance in lieu of regular Unemployment Benefits.

=== Veterans' Services ===
Pennsylvania CareerLink is mandated by law to provide priority service to Pennsylvania's veteran population.

Veterans' representatives provide assistance with referral services, job development, referral to training, and referral to government and community veteran service agencies. In addition they attempt to match the veteran's skills with employer job openings.

Special emphasis is placed on helping disabled veterans and those leaving the military.

Veterans representatives often serve multiple Pennsylvania CareerLink offices and move throughout a given geographic area. However, comprehensive outreach and assistance is always available for veterans and their families through five Governor's Veterans Outreach and Assistance Centers.

== The future of Pennsylvania CareerLink ==
In November 2005 the state unveiled the alpha version of its Comprehensive Workforce Development System (CWDS) project website to users of the official Pennsylvania CareerLink website.

The CWDS site, often referred to as "Pennsylvania CareerLink II", is projected for release in 2007. The service will provide an even more tightly integrated system for searching for workforce related information.

Officially all of Pennsylvania's Workforce development services will be accessible through this Central Access point. Though some features such as integration with the Department of Public Welfare have a release date projected beyond the initial public release of the CWDS site.

While the CWDS system will effectively rename the Pennsylvania CareerLink website (by absorbing all of its workforce related functions) there are no current indications that the Pennsylvania CareerLink itself will undergo a similar change in name.
