= Southeast Delco School District =

School district in Pennsylvania, US

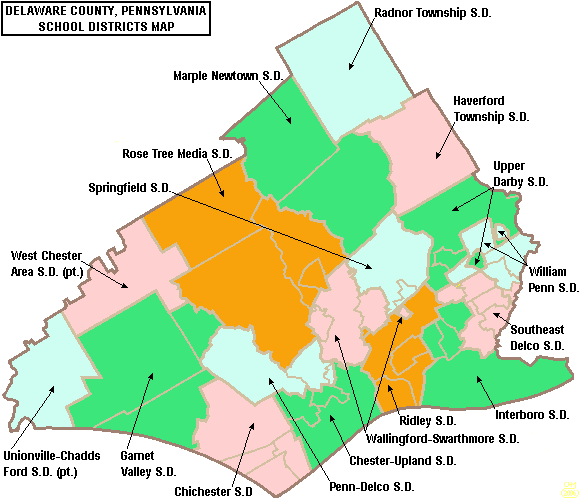

Address
- 1560 Delmar Drive Folcroft, Pennsylvania, 19032-0328; United States

District information
- Type: Public

Other information
- Website: www.sedelco.org

Southeast Delco School District is a midsized, regional suburban public school district located in Delaware County, Pennsylvania. The District encompasses approximately 10 km^{2} (3.9 sq mi). It serves the residents of Collingdale, Darby Township, Folcroft, and Sharon Hill. The district is adjacent to the City of Philadelphia. The district was created from the merging of smaller, local school districts. According to 2000 federal census data, it served a resident population of 30,732. In 2009, the district residents’ per capita income was $17,418, while the median family income was $47,321. In the Commonwealth, the median family income was $49,501 and the United States median family income was $49,445, in 2010.

== Schools ==
- Kindergarten Center (Darby Township)
- Grades 1-8 Schools:
  - Darby Township School (Darby Township)
  - Delcroft School (Folcroft)
  - Harris School (Collingdale)
  - Sharon Hill School (Sharon Hill)
- Academy Park High School (Sharon Hill)
