= Collingdale, Pennsylvania =

Borough in Pennsylvania, US

- Borough
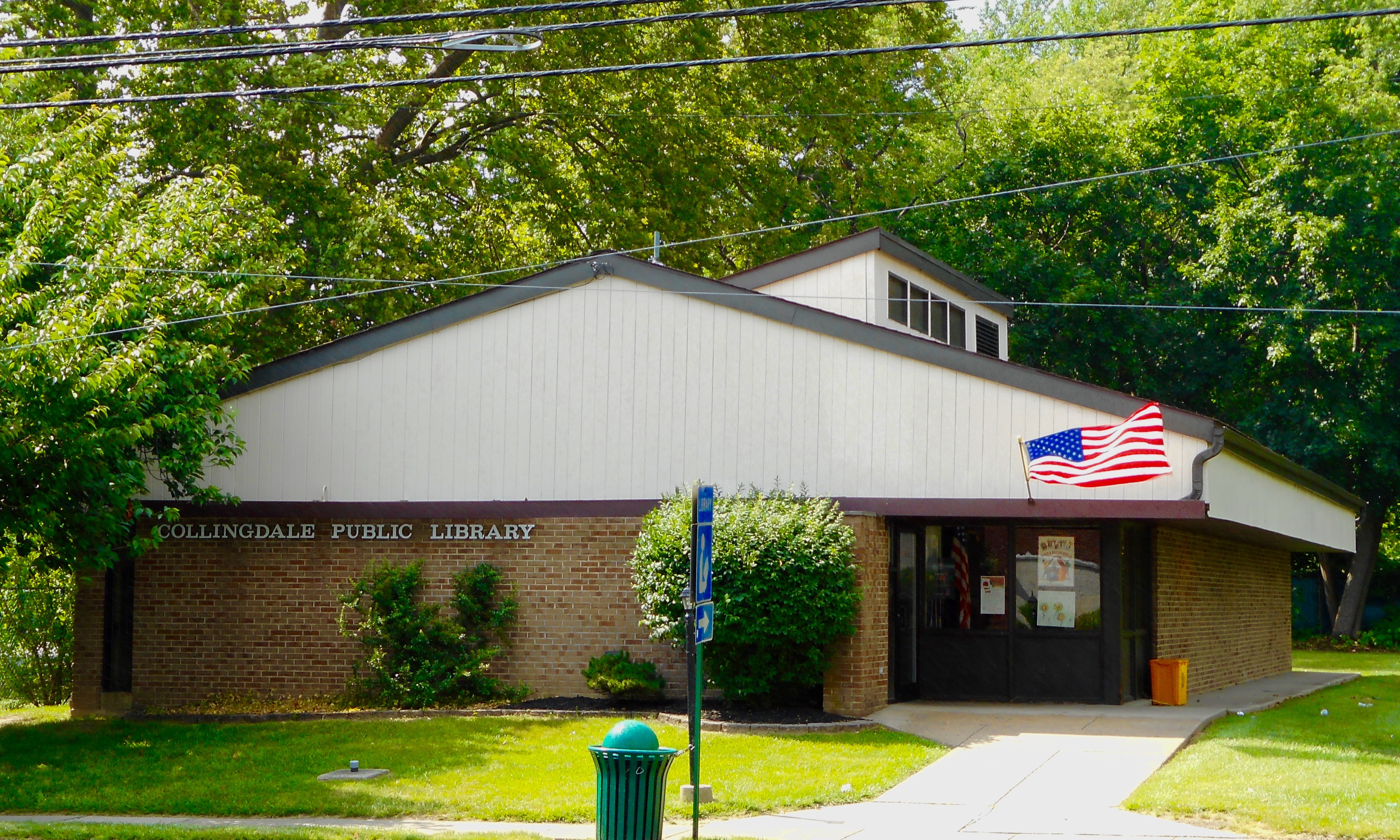
- Collingdale Public Library

- Location in Delaware County and the U.S. state of Pennsylvania

- Location in Pennsylvania Location in the United States
- Coordinates: 39°54′50″N 75°16′43″W
- Country: United States
- State: Pennsylvania
- County: Delaware

Government
  - Type: Council-Manager
  - Mayor: Donna Matteo-Spadea (D)

Area
  - Total: 0.87 sq mi (2.25 km^{2})
  - Land: 0.87 sq mi (2.25 km^{2})
  - Water: 0 sq mi (0.00 km^{2})
- Elevation: 95 ft (29 m)

Population (2020)
  - Total: 8,908
  - Density: 10,245.2/sq mi (3,955.71/km^{2})
- Time zone: UTC-5 (EST)
  - Summer (DST): UTC-4 (EDT)
- ZIP Code: 19023
- Area code: 610
- FIPS code: 42-15232
- Website: www.collingdaleborough.com

Collingdale is a borough in Delaware County, Pennsylvania, United States. The population was 8,908 at the 2020 census.

== Local governance ==
The Borough of Collingdale follows a council-manager form of governance.

The Borough Council is composed of seven at-large council members, which are elected during PA municipal elections. The voters elect three or four members of council each municipal election, each for a term 4 years. Every two years the council reorganizes, with the members electing the officers of the board, president and vice-president.

Donna Matteo-Spadea is the current mayor of Collingdale, and oversees certain aspects of the Collingdale Police Department's operations (as defined by the Pennsylvania Consolidated Statutes).

Frank Kelly served twelve consecutive four-year terms as Mayor of Collingdale until his passing in November 2018. He served over 47 consecutive years as Mayor of Collingdale. The borough council appointed Joseph Ciavarelli to fill the vacancy in the office of Mayor after Kelly's death. Ciavarelli lost the 2019 special mayoral election to the last mayor, Felecia Coffee. Making history, Felecia Coffee was the first African-American, the first female, and the first Democrat to ever be elected as mayor in the borough. Coffee was mayor for just months before the city shut down across Philadelphia area amidst COVID-19 pandemic. In a close race, Coffee lost the 2021 election to the current mayor, Donna Matteo-Spadea.

The borough manager, appointed by council, is the chief administrative officer of municipal services.

== In popular culture ==
- Southern rock group 38 Special used the Collingdale Police force in making the video for their song "Back Where You Belong". In the video the Collingdale chief of police Robert Morris began the video with an homage to the TV show "Hill Street Blues". After giving a short speech, he told the officers: "Let's be careful out there", a signature line from the TV show.. Part of the video was filmed in neighboring Philadelphia under the Walt Whitman Bridge.
- The YouTube weather docuseries Storm Sliders is filmed in Collingdale. First started in 2016, the fourth season has been on hiatus since late 2019.

== Geography ==
Collingdale is located at 39°54′50″N 75°16′43″W (39.913889, -75.278647). According to the U.S. Census Bureau, the borough has a total area of 0.9 square miles (2.3 km^{2}), all land.

== Demographics ==
Historical population
Census	Pop.	Note	%±
1900	603		—
1910	1,361		125.7%
1920	3,834		181.7%
1930	7,857		104.9%
1940	8,162		3.9%
1950	8,443		3.4%
1960	10,268		21.6%
1970	10,605		3.3%
1980	9,539		−10.1%
1990	9,175		−3.8%
2000	8,664		−5.6%
2010	8,786		1.4%
2020	8,908		1.4%

=== 2020 ===
Collingdale borough, Pennsylvania – Racial and ethnic composition Note: the US Census treats Hispanic/Latino as an ethnic category. This table excludes Latinos from the racial categories and assigns them to a separate category. Hispanics/Latinos may be of any race.
Race / Ethnicity (NH = Non-Hispanic)	Pop 2000	Pop 2010	Pop 2020	% 2000	% 2010	2020
White alone (NH)	7,924	4,823	2,820	91.46%	54.89%	31.66%
Black or African American alone (NH)	386	3,115	4,855	4.46%	35.45%	54.50%
Native American or Alaska Native alone (NH)	24	22	30	0.28%	0.25%	0.34%
Asian alone (NH)	140	248	295	1.62%	2.82%	3.31%
Pacific Islander alone (NH)	1	1	0	0.01%	0.01%	0.00%
Other race alone (NH)	10	19	75	0.12%	0.22%	0.84%
Mixed race or Multiracial (NH)	102	284	390	1.18%	3.23%	4.38%
Hispanic or Latino (any race)	77	274	443	0.89%	3.12%	4.97%
Total	8,664	8,786	8,908	100.00%	100.00%	100.00%

As of 2010 census, the racial makeup of the borough was 55.9% White, 36.3% African American, 0.3% Native American, 2.9% Asian, 0.8% from other races, and 3.8% from two or more races. Hispanic or Latino of any race were 3.1% of the population .

As of the 2000 census, there were 8,664 people, 3,188 households, and 2,183 families residing in the borough. The population density was 9,995.9 inhabitants per square mile (3,859.4/km^{2}). There were 3,404 housing units at an average density of 3,927.3 per square mile (1,516.3/km^{2}). The racial makeup of the borough was 49.36% White, 51.274% African American, 0.29% Native American, 1.62% Asian, 0.01% Pacific Islander, 0.24% from other races, and 1.20% from two or more races. Hispanic or Latino of any race were 0.89% of the population.

There were 3,188 households, out of which 33.9% had children under the age of 18 living with them, 46.0% were married couples living together, 16.5% had a female householder with no husband present, and 31.5% were non-families. 26.8% of all households were made up of individuals, and 10.8% had someone living alone who was 65 years of age or older. The average household size was 2.71 and the average family size was 3.32.

In the borough, the population was spread out, with 28.6% under the age of 18, 8.3% from 18 to 24, 31.1% from 25 to 44, 19.0% from 45 to 64, and 13.0% who were 65 years of age or older. The median age was 34 years. For every 100 females there were 94.3 males. For every 100 females age 18 and over, there were 90.4 males.

The median income for a household in the borough was $40,207, and the median income for a family was $47,288. Males had a median income of $38,015 versus $27,955 for females. The per capita income for the borough was $16,751. About 6.9% of families and 8.4% of the population were below the poverty line, including 11.7% of those under age 18 and 3.3% of those age 65 or over.

== Education ==
Students are in the Southeast Delco School District. Most K-8 school residents in Collingdale are zoned to the Harris School, while a few are zoned to Darby Township School. All residents of the school district are zoned to Academy Park High School.

Harris School teaches 771 students from 1st-8th grades in the Southeast Delco School District.

The Roman Catholic Archdiocese of Philadelphia formerly operated St. Joseph School in Collingdale, which closed in 2010. There were 140 prospective children for the 2010–2011 school year that did not happen when the archdiocese wanted 200. Schools taking former St. Joseph's children were Our Lady of Fatima in Secane, St. Eugene in Primos, and St. Gabriel in Norwood.

== Transportation ==
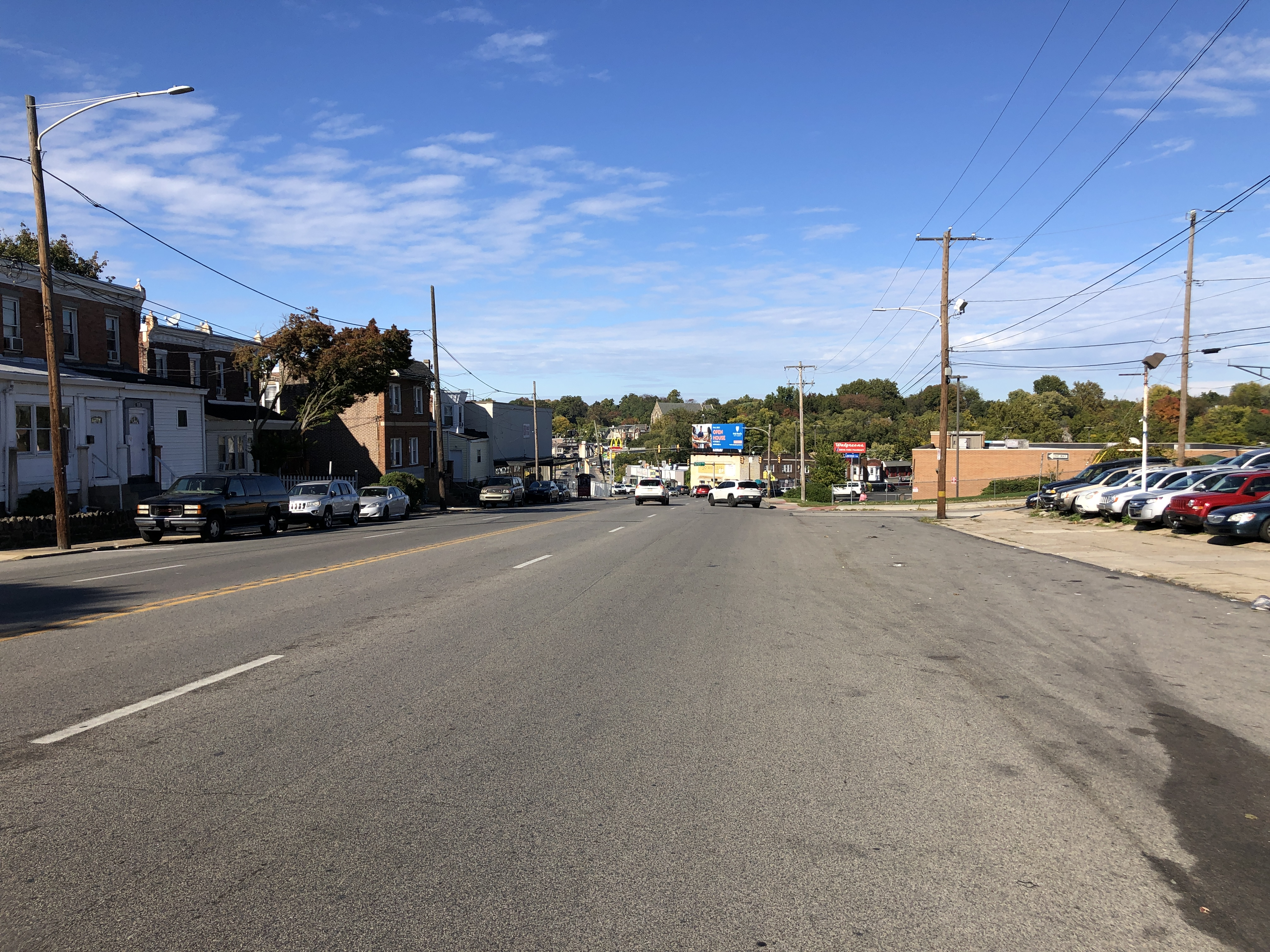
US 13 northbound in Collingdale

As of 2013 there were 16.34 miles (26.30 km) of public roads in Collingdale, of which 3.28 miles (5.28 km) were maintained by the Pennsylvania Department of Transportation (PennDOT) and 13.06 miles (21.02 km) were maintained by the borough.

U.S. Route 13 crosses the eastern corner of the borough. MacDade Boulevard (running approximately northeast-southwest), Clifton Avenue, and Woodlawn Avenue (both northwest-southeast) are the principal streets.

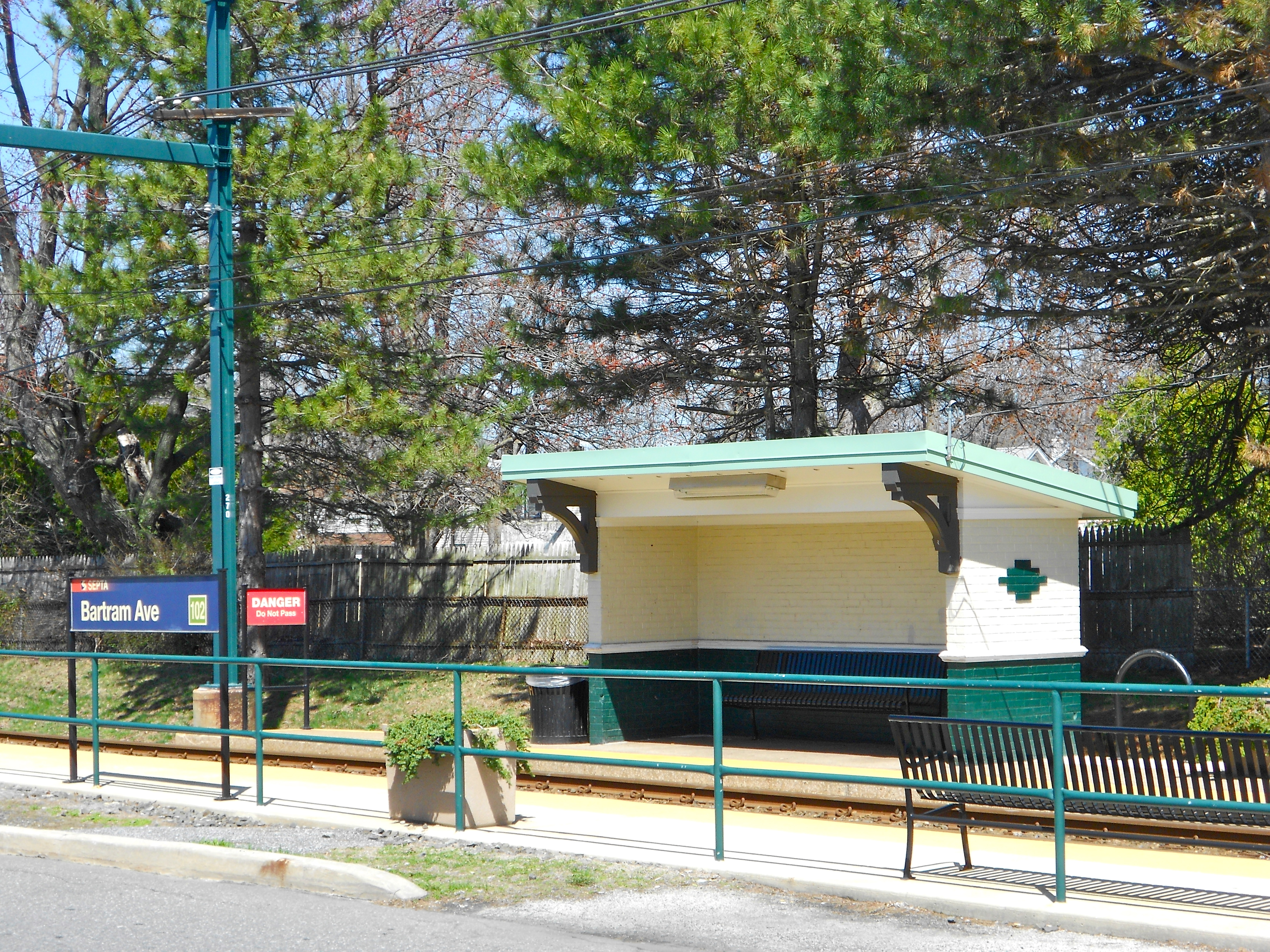
Bartram Avenue SEPTA station

SEPTA's D light rail line passes through the borough, with four stops in it. The bus route 113 passes thru on Macdade Blvd. The SEPTA Media/Wawa Line regional rail line passes nearby to the north; the closest stations are Clifton-Aldan and Primos.

== Landmarks ==
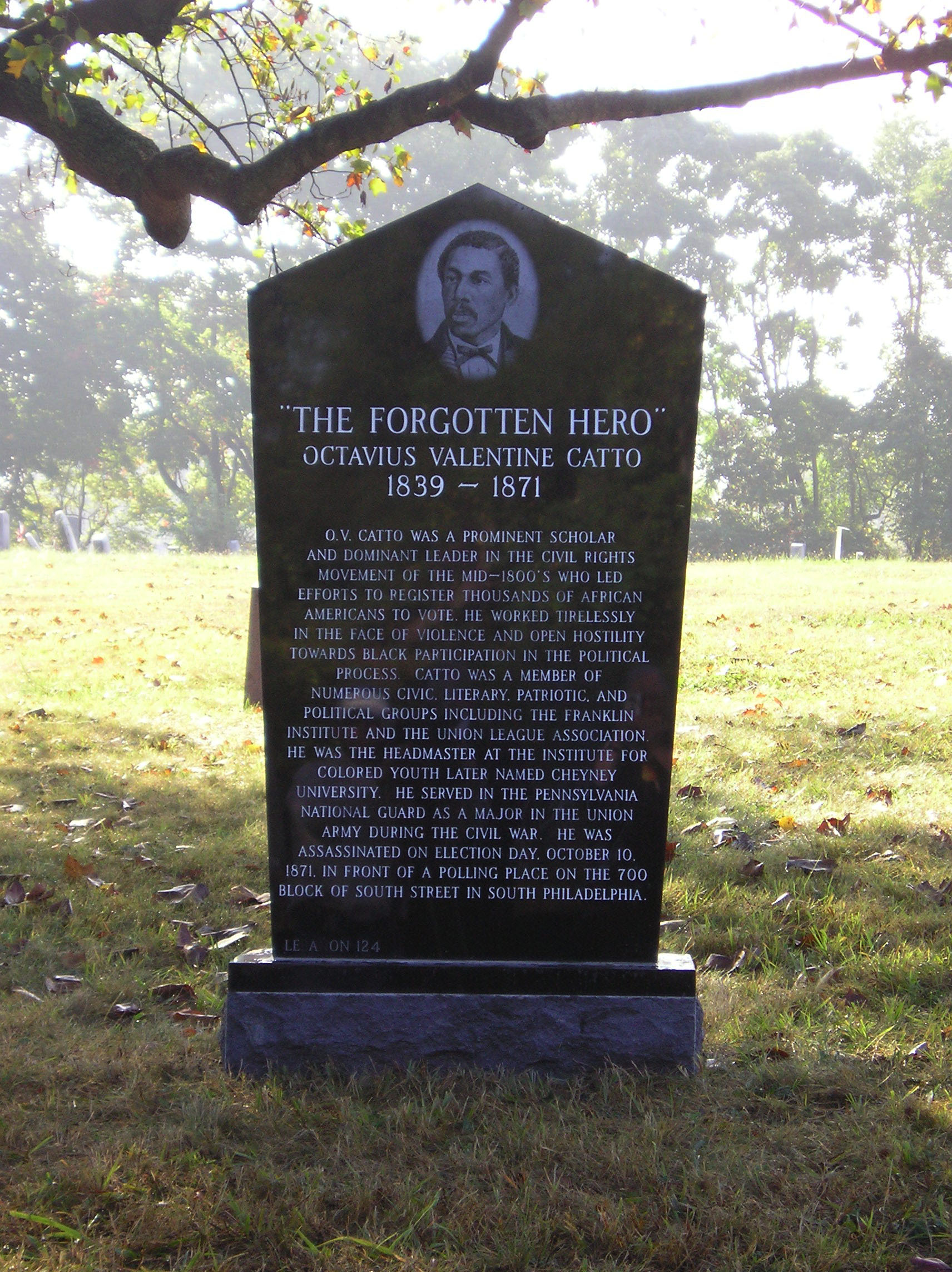
Octavius Catto's grave in Eden Cemetery

A significant portion of Collingdale's area is made up of four cemeteries, three of which are active. Eden Cemetery is an African-American cemetery, where many notable persons are buried, including singer Marian Anderson, physician Rebecca Cole, and civil rights activist Octavius Catto. It was listed on the National Register of Historic Places in 2010. Har Zion Cemetery and Mt. Lebanon Cemetery are Jewish cemeteries. The fourth, an American Civil War–era cemetery, has been maintained by a local Veterans of Foreign Wars Post.
