= Academy Park High School =

Coordinates: 39.9077°N 75.2680°W

- 300 Calcon Hook Road; Sharon Hill, Pennsylvania 19079

Information
- School type: Public, Secondary
- Established: 1982; 44 years ago
- School district: Southeast Delco School District
- Principal: Richard Sherin
- Staff: 79.00 (on an FTE basis)
- Enrollment: 1,286 (2023-2024)
- Student to teacher ratio: 16.28
- Colors: Blue and Silver
- Website: Academy Park High School

Academy Park High School is a four-year public high school in Sharon Hill, Pennsylvania. It is currently the only high school in the Southeast Delco School District.

Academy Park High School was formed in the fall of 1982, and its building opened fall of 1984. In the interim, the old Sharon Hill and Collingdale high schools were used as east and west campuses, respectively, for the new school. The former Darby Township High School was converted into Ashland Middle School. Portions of the old Collingdale High School still stand, serving as the town’s borough hall and a municipal court, while the old Sharon Hill High School was demolished. Though the building is gone, the school’s former football field serves as home to the Academy Park Knights.

Academy Park’s first principal, Agnes M. Paterson, was an active supporter of the school’s activities and students. She died unexpectedly in spring 1987 after attending a performance of the school district’s annual spring musical. The school’s auditorium has been named in her honor.
