= William Penn School District =

School district in Pennsylvania

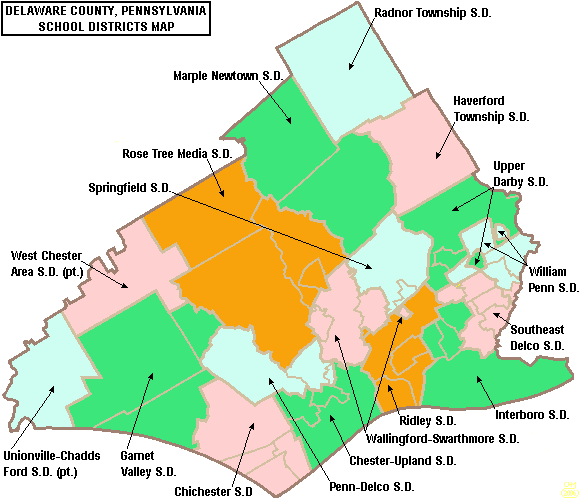
- Map of public school districts in Delaware County, PA

District information
- Type: Public
- Grades: K-12
- Established: 1972; 54 years ago
- Superintendent: Dr. Eric J. Becoats
- Schools: Aldan Elementary, Ardmore Avenue Elementary, Bell Avenue Elementary, Colwyn Elementary, East Lansdowne Elementary, Evans Elementary, Park Lane Elementary, Walnut Street Elementary, Penn Wood Middle School, Penn Wood Ninth Grade Academy, Penn Wood High School
- NCES District ID: 4226390

Students and staff
- Students: 4,543

Other information
- Website: https://williampennsd.org/

The William Penn School District is a public school district located in Delaware County, Pennsylvania. It comprises eight elementary schools, one middle school, and one high school, based on two campuses. The district serves the boroughs of Aldan, Colwyn, Darby, East Lansdowne, Lansdowne, and Yeadon. The district is adjacent to the City of Philadelphia. As of 2024, the total enrollment was 4,543. The district administration offices are located in Lansdowne.

== History ==
The district was created in 1972 from the consolidation of three smaller, local districts (Darby-Colwyn, Lansdowne-Aldan, and Yeadon). The consolidation was one of many mergers mandated by the Pennsylvania Human Relations Commission during this era to facilitate the racial integration of schools in the Philadelphia area.

=== Fair Funding Lawsuit ===
The William Penn School District has faced budgetary shortfalls throughout its history. In 2014, the district partnered with the Public Interest Law Center along with several other school districts, parents, and advocacy groups to file a lawsuit saying that the state's process for funding schools, which relies heavily on local taxes, thereby creating significant per-student funding gaps between wealthy districts and low-wealth ones, is tantamount to discrimination.

In 2023, the Commonwealth Court of Pennsylvania ruled that the Pennsylvania General Assembly had created “manifest deficiencies” between high-wealth and low-wealth school districts with “no rational basis” for the funding gaps. The ruling stated that the Pennsylvania Constitution's Education Clause was “clearly, palpably, and plainly violated because of a failure to provide all students with access to a comprehensive, effective, and contemporary system of public education that will give them a meaningful opportunity to succeed academically, socially, and civically.”

In spite of the precedent-setting success of this lawsuit, the state has been slow to provide relief to the district, which has compounded its financial challenges.

== Schools ==
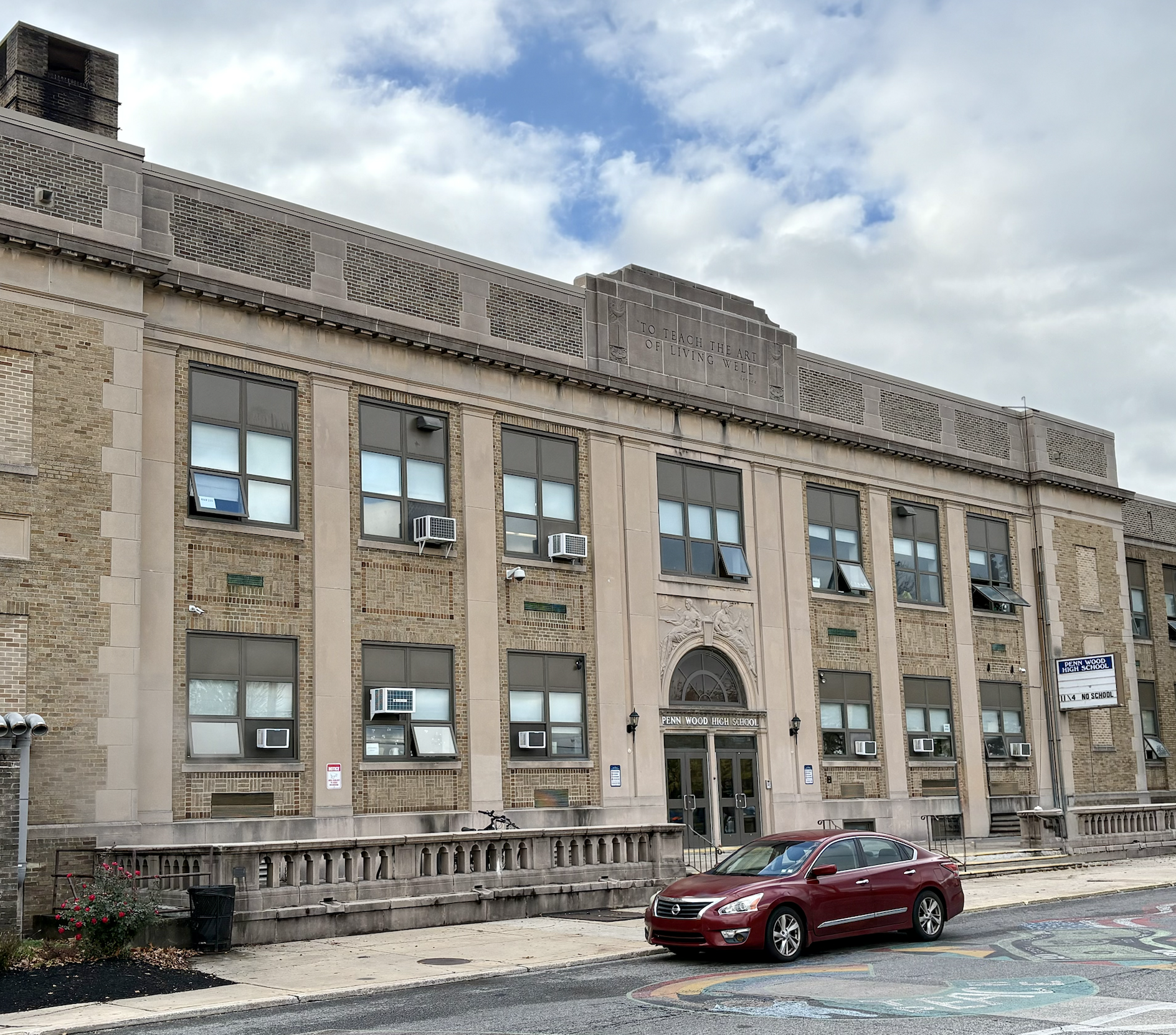
Penn Wood High School in Lansdowne

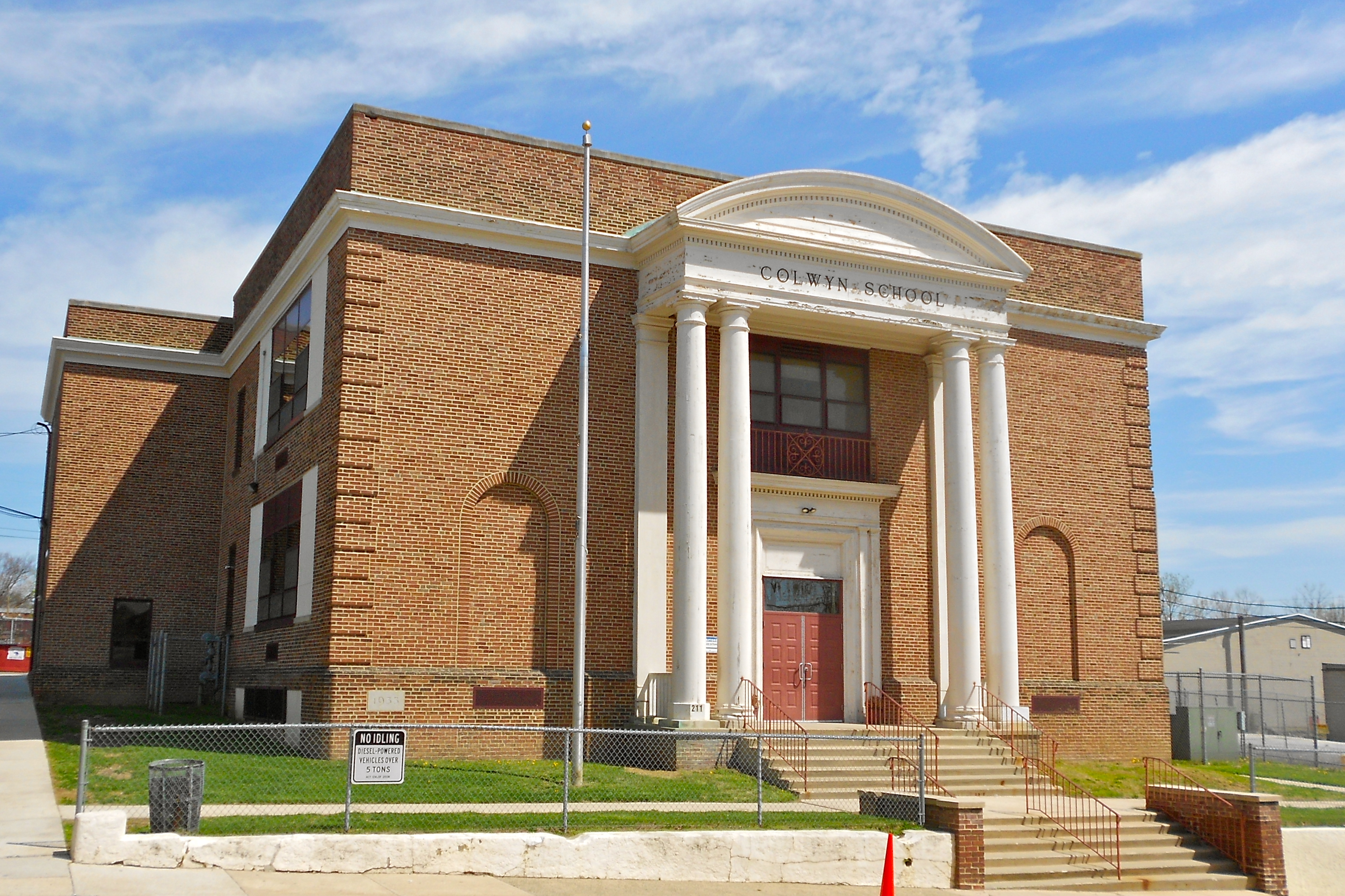
Colwyn Elementary School in Colwyn

=== High Schools ===
- Penn Wood High School, Lansdowne
- Penn Wood Ninth Grade Academy, Yeadon

=== Middle School ===
- Penn Wood Middle School, Darby

=== Elementary Schools ===
- Aldan Elementary School, Aldan
- Ardmore Avenue Elementary School, Lansdowne
- Bell Avenue Elementary School, Yeadon
- Colwyn Elementary School, Colwyn
- East Lansdowne Elementary School, East Lansdowne
  - In 1972 the school's library was opened to the public, one of the few school libraries to do so, as East Lansdowne had no other public library.
- Park Lane Elementary School, Darby
- Walnut Street Elementary School, Darby
- William B. Evans Elementary School, Yeadon

== See also ==
- William Penn School District v. Pennsylvania Department of Education
