= William Penn School District v. Pennsylvania Department of Education =

Pennsylvania court case regarding public education funding

- Court: Commonwealth Court of Pennsylvania
- Full case name: William Penn School District; Panther Valley School District; The School District of Lancaster; Greater Johnstown School District; Wilkes-Barre Area School District; Shenandoah Valley School District; Jamella and Bryant Miller, parents of K.M., a minor; Sheila Armstrong, parent of S.A., minor; Tracey Hughes, parent of P.M.H., minor; Pennsylvania Association of Rural and Small Schools; and The National Association for the Advancement of Colored People-Pennsylvania State Conference v. Pennsylvania Department of Education; Kim L. Ward, in her official capacity as President Pro-Tempore of the Pennsylvania Senate; Mark Rozzi, in his official capacity as the Speaker of the Pennsylvania House of Representatives; Josh Shapiro, in his official capacity as the Governor of the Commonwealth of Pennsylvania; Pennsylvania State Board of Education; and Dr. Khalid N. Mumin, in his official capacity as Acting Secretary of Education
- Decided: February 7, 2023

Case opinions
- Pennsylvania schools don’t have the resources to adequately educate all students, and the gaps between the haves and have nots render the system unconstitutional.
- Decision by: Renee Cohn Jubilerer

William Penn School District et al. v. Pennsylvania Department of Education et al. was a landmark decision of the Commonwealth Court of Pennsylvania on funding for public education by the Pennsylvania General Assembly. The Court ruled that the underfunding of rural and underprivileged school districts violated the Pennsylvania Constitution.

== Background ==
Pennsylvania primarily funds schools at the local level through local property taxes.

== History ==
In 2014, the William Penn School District partnered with the Public Interest Law Center along with several other school districts, parents, and advocacy groups to file a lawsuit saying that the state's process for funding schools, which relies heavily on local taxes, thereby creating significant per-student funding gaps between wealthy districts and low-wealth ones, is tantamount to discrimination.

== Ruling ==
On February 7, 2023, the Court ruled that the Pennsylvania General Assembly had created “manifest deficiencies” between high-wealth and low-wealth school districts with “no rational basis” for the funding gaps. The ruling stated that the Pennsylvania Constitution's Education Clause was “clearly, palpably, and plainly violated because of a failure to provide all students with access to a comprehensive, effective, and contemporary system of public education that will give them a meaningful opportunity to succeed academically, socially, and civically.”
