= Public Interest Law Center =

- Founded: 1969
- Type: Nonpartisan
- Purpose: Public interest litigation
- Location: Philadelphia, Pennsylvania
- Region served: United States
- Key people: Brent W. Landau, Executive Director
- Employees: 12 (2016)
- Website: www.pilcop.org

The Public Interest Law Center, founded in 1969, is a nonprofit law firm based in Philadelphia. The Public Interest Law Center works primarily in the greater Philadelphia region occasionally taking on issues on a national scale.

The Public Interest Law Center's project areas include education, voting, employment, environmental justice, healthcare, housing, and community services.

== History ==
Founded by Edwin D. (Ned) Wolf, The Public Interest Law Center's history dates back to 1969, rooted in the Philadelphia chapter that was one of seven local affiliates of the Lawyers' Committee for Civil Rights Under Law. In its early years, the Public Interest Law Center's initial mission was to dismantle specific aspects of institutional racism by targeting discriminatory policies and practices.

== Project Areas ==
The Public Interest Law Centers aims to use high-impact legal strategies to both promote and protect the marginalized through project areas including Education, Voting, Employment, Environmental Justice, Healthcare, Housing and Community Services and voting.

A full list of The Public Interest Law Center's litigation can be found on the organization's website.

== Notable former associates ==
- Gilbert F. Casellas, former board member — Chairman of OMNITRU
- Thomas Gilhool, former staff attorney — Former Pennsylvania Secretary of Education
- Jordan Konell, former intern — 2015 Rhodes Scholar

== Thaddeus Stevens Awardees ==
The Public Interest Law Center annually presents the Thaddeus Stevens Award to either individuals or organizations whose actions best correspond with its social mission.

- 2000: William T. Coleman, Jr
- 2010: Governor Ed Rendell; Hon. Doris Smith-Ribner; Sec. Donna Cooper
- 2011: Jerome Balter
- 2012: Dechert LLP
- 2013: DLA Piper LLP; Thomas B. Schmidt III
- 2014: Pennsylvania State Conference of NAACP Branches; William H. Ewing; Kessler Topaz Meltzer & Check, LLP
- 2015: School Funding Lawsuit Clients; H. Laddie Montague, Jr.

== Awards ==
- 1978: The Delaware Valley Council on Services for the Handicapped's Annual Award for Outstanding Service to the Handicapped Community
- 1997: Citizen's Committee on Public Education in Philadelphia's John N. Patterson Award for Excellence in Education
- 1997: The Barristers' Association of Philadelphia's Cecil B. Moore Community Service Award
- 1999: National Down Syndrome Congress' Education Award
- 1999: The Michigan Academy of Pediatrics' Special Recognition Award
- 2009: Inglis Award for Continuing Excellence
- 2006: Society for Developmental and Behavioral Pediatrics' Special Recognition Award
- 2012: Pennsylvania Budget and Policy Center's Be The Change Award for Extraordinary Work Protecting Pennsylvanians' Right to Vote
- 2015: The Barristers' Association of Philadelphia's Martin Luther King, Jr. Award for Outstanding Service to the Community
- 2015: NAACP's Juanita Jackson Mitchell Award
