= John C. Bowers =

African American businessman (1811–1873)

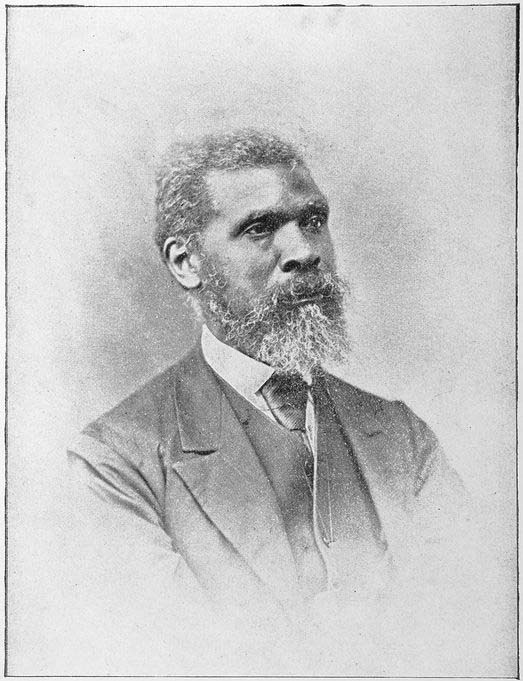
- Born: February 9, 1811; Philadelphia, Pennsylvania, US
- Died: October 5, 1873 (aged 62); Philadelphia, Pennsylvania, US
- Resting place: Eden Cemetery, Collingdale, Pennsylvania
- Occupations: Entrepreneur, organist, vestryman
- Organization: St. Thomas African Episcopal Church,
- Movement: Colored Conventions Movement
- Spouse: Mary C. Collins
- Relatives: Thomas Bowers (brother); Henrietta Duterte (sister)

John C. Bowers, Jr. (February 9, 1811 – October 5, 1873) was an African American entrepreneur, organist and vestryman at St. Thomas African Episcopal Church, and a founding member of the first Grand United Order of Odd Fellows for African Americans in Pennsylvania. He was active in the anti-slavery movement in Philadelphia, and involved in the founding of several organizations including the Pennsylvania Anti-Slavery Society. "A fervent abolitionist and outspoken opponent of colonization, [he] was much in demand as a public speaker."

== Early life and career ==
John C. Bowers was born in Philadelphia, Pennsylvania, to John and Henrietta Bowers. His father, John C. Bowers Sr. (1773–1844), was a secondhand clothing dealer, a vestryman and school trustee at St. Thomas African Episcopal Church, and one of the founders of the Pennsylvania Anti-Slavery Society.

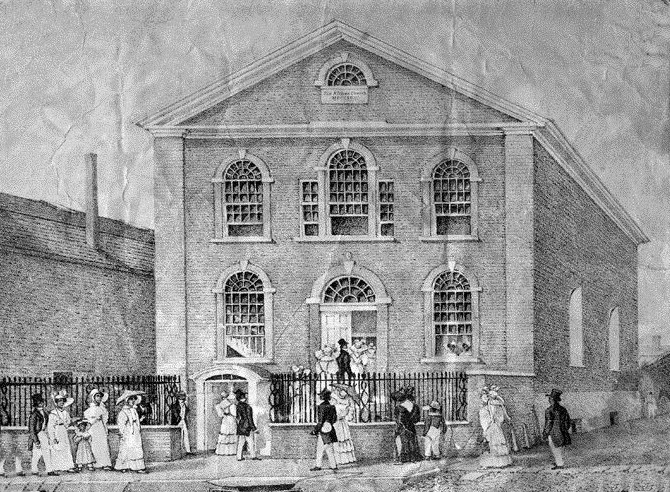
Bowers was organist at the St. Thomas African Episcopal Church

The younger Bowers was also a member of St. Thomas African Episcopal Church, where he became the organist. Two of his siblings pursued singing careers. Bowers trained his brother, Thomas Bowers, in the piano and organ; eventually his brother pursued voice training with famed African American concert artist Elizabeth Taylor Greenfield, and embarked on a solo career as a concert tenor. Their sister Sarah Sedgwick Bowers studied as a concert soprano and toured professionally in 1856.

John C. Bowers trained as a tailor and became the proprietor of a clothing shop at No. 71 South Second Street, Philadelphia. Martin Delany describes him as the owner of a "fashionable merchant tailor shop" together with his brother, Thomas, catering to upper class gentlemen and businessmen in Philadelphia, while Henry M. Minton characterizes him as "the most prominent" of 15 tailors in the city.

== Community activism ==
Bowers was a member of several literary societies. He was one of the signatories of the constitution of the Philadelphia Library Company of Colored Persons, instituted on January 1, 1833. The company's object was "the collection of a library of useful works of every description, for the benefit of its members, who might there successfully apply without comparatively any cost, for that mental good which they could not readily obtain elsewhere". For a membership fee of $1, African Americans of all classes were afforded an opportunity to further educate themselves. The library's members adopted a system of organized reading and weekly debate that enabled its members to practice elocution and public speaking. In spite of its name, the Library Company was a male institution. Bowers also supported the education of women, writing to the Liberator in 1834 in praise of women's literary groups. Bowers was involved in starting the Gilbert Lyceum, instituted on January 31, 1841, which enabled women and men to work together in literary and scientific pursuits. He became secretary of the weekly newspaper The Colored American in 1841.

As a member of the Library Association of Philadelphia, he was a delegate to the first meeting of the American Moral Reform Society in 1837, where he gave a speech on temperance. The society's platform included "Education, Temperance, Economy and Universal Liberty". Bowers was also a member of the Association for Moral and Mental Improvement.

When the Pennsylvania Constitutional Convention of 1838 (known as the Reform Convention) met to amend the state constitution to restrict suffrage to whites, blacks formed their own Committee to respond. J. C. Bowers was one of that committee, along with Robert Purvis, James Cornish, Robert B. Forten, J. J. G. Bias, James Needham, and John P. Burr. They prepared and published the "Appeal of Forty Thousand Citizens Threatened with Disenfranchisement, To the People of Pennsylvania", hoping to convince white citizens not to approve the amended constitution. Bowers was active in raising money for the publication. In spite of their efforts, the citizens of Pennsylvania ratified the new state constitution on October 9, 1838, disenfranchising free African Americans in Pennsylvania. The franchise was not regained until the 15th Amendment was passed in 1869. During that time, Bowers continued to lobby for African American suffrage.

He was a vocal opponent of the American Colonization Society, which promoted the idea that free blacks should leave the United States and emigrate to Liberia. In 1855 he was a delegate to the Colored National Convention, and in 1865 he was elected president of the Colored People's Union League of Philadelphia. In 1865, he also joined the Pennsylvania State Equal Rights League. He encouraged the enlistment of black soldiers in the Union Army; a September 12, 1863, article in The Weekly Anglo-African noted that he was one of those who "presented the regimental colors to the Sixth United States Colored Troop", and afterwards spoke to them, praising the courage of black troops in the war effort.

Bowers was concerned with institutions for mutual relief, and helped to compile and publish a list of aid societies for African Americans in 1831. Bowers was a founding member of Unity Lodge No. 711, the first lodge of the Grand United Order of Odd Fellows to be established in Pennsylvania for African Americans, on June 5, 1845. The Odd Fellows provided mutual aid, similar to insurance, with practical benefits for events such as illness, death, disability, and widowhood. Bowers was involved in this "friendly society" for African Americans throughout the rest of his life. He served repeatedly as a Director, for three terms as Deputy Grand Master (1855, 1857, 1858), and for one term as Grand Master (1870).

In an obituary for Bowers, The Philadelphia Inquirer wrote: "he was an active and enterprising citizen, warmly interested in all plans for the advancement of his people, prominent in his hostility to slavery." His death was also reported in San Francisco's Pacific Appeal, an African American newspaper that spoke of him as "one of the very best representative colored men that Philadelphia could boast of."

== Personal ==
In 1835 John C. Bowers married Mary C. Collins, daughter of Cato Collins. She taught Sunday school in the church. She died a year after their marriage.

Bowers died in 1873 and was buried in Lebanon Cemetery in Philadelphia. In 1903, his remains and those of others were moved to Eden Cemetery in Collingdale, Delaware County, Pennsylvania – the oldest public African American burial ground in the United States. Burials from Lebanon and other cemeteries were moved because of construction projects within the city of Philadelphia.
