= Frank Coleman =

Frank Coleman may refer to:

- Frank Coleman (businessman) (born 1953), Newfoundland and Labrador businessman
- Frank Coleman (counselor) (1912–2008), educator and community volunteer.
- Frank Joseph Coleman (1886–1934), U.S. federal judge
- Frank J. Coleman (1888–1948), American silent film actor
- Francis Coleman (1924–2008), conductor and television producer
- Frank "Weinie" Coleman, outlaw killed by Vernon C. Miller
- Frank Coleman, co-founder of Omega Psi Phi

== See also ==
- Frank Colman (1918–1983), Canadian Major League Baseball player
