= Henrietta Duterte =

American funeral home owner and abolitionist (1817–1903)

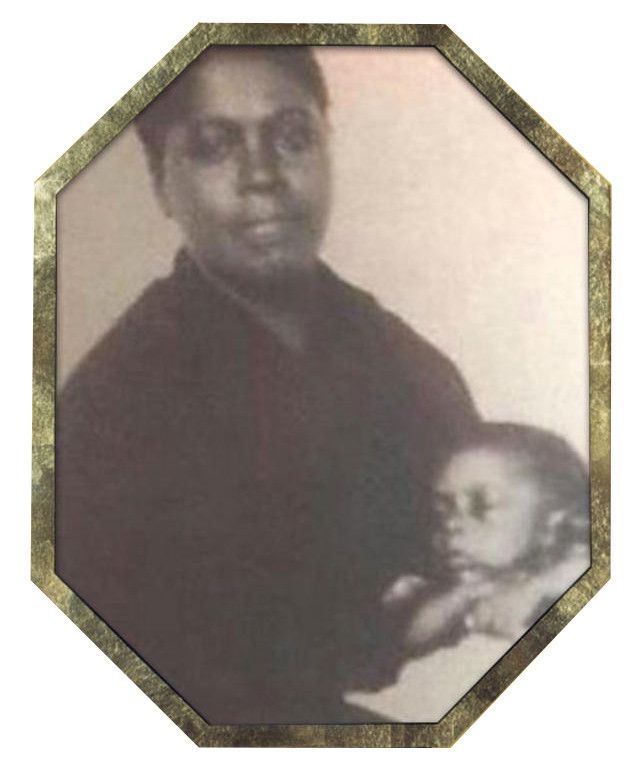
- Born: Henrietta Bowers; July 1817
- Died: December 23, 1903 (aged 86)
- Resting place: Eden Cemetery (Collingdale, Pennsylvania)
- Occupations: funeral home owner, abolitionist
- Known for: First American woman to own a mortuary
- Spouse: Frances Duterte (married 1852–1859)
- Relatives: Thomas Bowers (brother); John C. Bowers (brother)

Henrietta Duterte (née Bowers; July 1817 – December 23, 1903) was an African-American funeral home owner, philanthropist, and abolitionist from Philadelphia, Pennsylvania. She was the first American woman to own a mortuary, and her business operated as a stop on the Underground Railroad.

== Biography ==
Henrietta Bowers was born to an affluent, free black family and raised in Philadelphia on Middle Alley which is now called Panama Street, in Philadelphia's Society Hill. She was one of 13 children, including entrepreneur, organist, and abolitionist John C. Bowers, and Thomas Bowers, a renowned opera singer known as "The Colored Mario." Known for her fashionable attire, she began her career as a tailor. In 1852 she married Francis A. Duterte, a Haitian-American owner of an undertaking business. None of their children survived infancy and Francis Duterte died in 1859.

After her husband's death, Duterte took over the funeral parlor and became the first American woman to operate such a business. The funeral home earned a reputation for quick undertaking service, which was necessary for the time before modern-day embalming methods. The business was estimated to gross $8,000/year (about $211,500 as of 2017) under her ownership.

Duterte was a member of the Underground Railroad, and used her business to assist fugitive slaves from southern states seeking freedom in the North. She often hid runaway slaves in coffins or disguised them as part of funeral processions. In addition, the success of the funeral parlor allowed her to make generous contributions to her community, and she supported the AME Church of St. Thomas, the Philadelphia Home for Aged and Infirm Colored Persons, and the Freedman's Aid Society, which was created after the Civil War to assist formerly enslaved people in Tennessee.

Later in her life, Duterte transferred ownership of the funeral home to her nephew, Joseph Seth. Henrietta died at the age of 86 on December 23, 1903, and is interred at the historic Eden Cemetery in Collingdale, Pennsylvania.
