= John Bunyan Reeve =

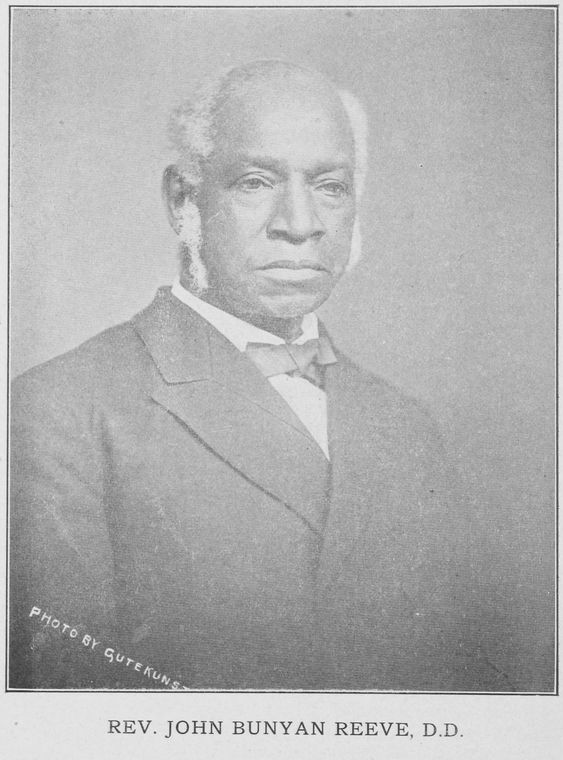
- Born: October 29, 1831; Mattituck, New York, U.S.
- Died: January 24, 1916 (aged 84); Philadelphia, Pennsylvania, U.S.
- Education: Union Theological Seminary
- Occupation: minister

Religious life
- Religion: Presbyterian

John Bunyan Reeve (October 29, 1831 - January 24, 1916) was a Presbyterian minister and professor at Howard University. In 1871 he organized the department of theology at Howard.

== Early life ==
John Bunyan Reeve was born October 29, 1831, in Mattituck, New York. He attended district schools and worked on a farm as a young man. His parents were Presbyterians and his mother pushed him to become a minister. As a young man he was a member of the Shiloh Presbyterian church under Rev. James W.C. Pennington. He worked as a teacher for a few months at New Tower, Long Island when, in 1853, he enrolled at the New York Central College at McGrawsville, New York, in a preparatory course for the seminary. He finished that program in June 1858 and entered the Union Theological Seminary in September 1858. Reeve was Union's first black student. As a student, he was supported financially and spiritually by William E. Dodge and Asa D. Smith. In April 1861 he graduated and became a minister at the Third Presbytery in New York City.

== Ministry ==
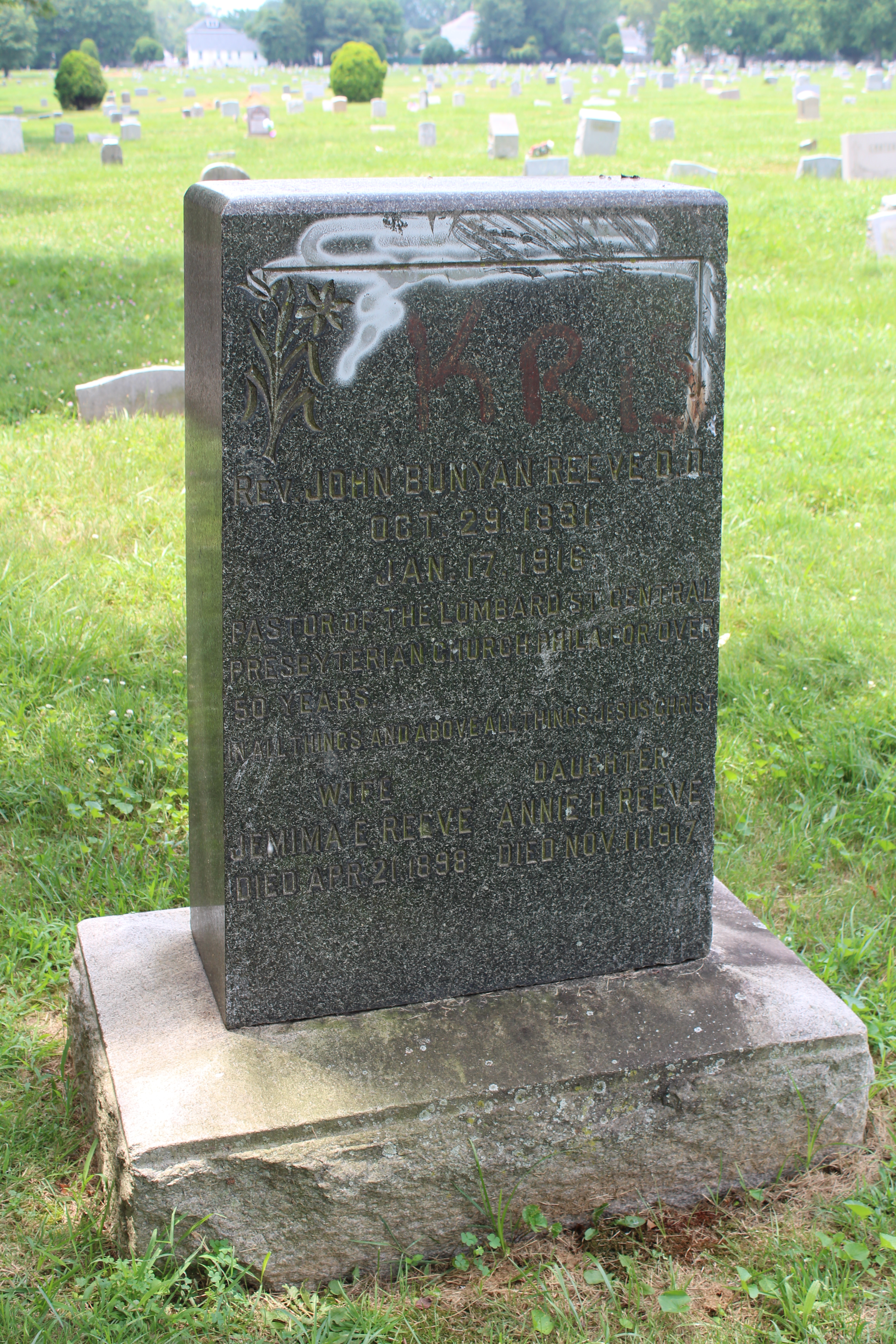
John Bunyan Reeve gravestone in Eden Cemetery

He was quickly dismissed to the Fourth Presbytery of Philadelphia and on June 14, 1861, he was ordained by the Fourth Presbytery and made pastor of the Lombard Street Central Presbyterian Church in Philadelphia succeeding B. F. Templeton in that role. In 1865, Reeve attended the General Assembly of the Presbyterian Church and was appointed by the Home Missionary Committee to visit the American Southwest (then comprising states like Tennessee, Mississippi, Missouri, Arkansas, Louisiana, and Texas) and work to organize black churches there. In 1870 he was given a doctorate in Divinity by Lincoln University, and his initial posting at the Lombard Street Central Presbyterian Church continued until September 1871. At that time he was appointed to organize a theological department at Howard University by Oliver O. Howard and became a professor there. In June 1875 he resigned from Howard and in September was reinstalled pastor at Lombard Street Central Presbyterian Church. He resigned as pastor in 1914 and served as pastor emeritus until his death in 1916.

Reeve was a distinguished leader in the church. In 1895, he was president of the Council of Colored Presbyterian Ministers and Elders in New York, New Jersey, Pennsylvania, Delaware, Maryland, and the District of Columbia.

== Personal life and family ==
Reeve's niece, Josephine Silone Yates, was a science professor at Lincoln University. In 1870, she lived with Reeve while studying at the Institute for Colored Youth. Reeve married Jemima E, who died April 21, 1898. Reeves died January 24, 1916, in Philadelphia after an illness of several months and was survived by two daughters. He is interred at Eden Cemetery in Collingdale, Pennsylvania.
