= Scholley Pace Alexander =

American politician (1902–1974)

Scholley Pace Alexander (June 8, 1902 – February 25, 1974) was a realtor and state legislator in Pennsylvania. He was born in Philadelphia. He represented Philadelphia County in the Pennsylvania House of Representatives. He was elected in 1952 beating incumbent Lewis M. Mintess and served from 1953 to 1954 and did not seek re-election.

He wrote to The Crisis applying for a job as its business manager and noted that he had served in the U.S. Army, had worked in theater, had graduated from Temple University, and had worked at his brother Raymond's law firm.
