= Hannah Archer Till =

Hannah Archer Till (c. 1721 – 1826) worked as a paid cook and servant for George Washington. Till accompanied General Washington on his American Revolutionary War campaigns and was present at Valley Forge. She also worked for the Marquis de Lafayette for six months. She was honored as a Patriot by the Daughters of the American Revolution in 2015, in Eden Cemetery, located in Collingdale, Pennsylvania.

== Early life and family ==
She was born in about 1721 in Kent County, Delaware. Her original name, Long Point, was chosen by her father, an Oneida Indian, for his successful encounter with a buck. Her mother was an enslaved African-American woman, but more about her identity is unknown.

Her owner, John Brinkly, sold her in Pennsylvania when she was 15. When she was 25, she was sold to Parson Henderson, who took her to Northumberland, England. Ten years later, the 35-year-old was purchased by Reverend John Mason of the Associate Reformed Church in New York.

Hannah married Isaac Till before the American Revolutionary War. Isaac (? – 1796) was a slave of Captain John Johnson of Bergen County, New Jersey.

== American Revolution ==
Around 1777, Hannah was leased to George Washington to serve as his cook. Isaac was also leased as a military cook. The Tills first appear in Washington's wartime expense book in early July 1776. The Tills had at least three children—Andrew (born circa 1761), John (born circa 1765) and Sarah Till (born circa 1771) —before the Continental Army's winter at Valley Forge; the couple lived and worked in the Isaac Potts house, known as Washington's headquarters, where Hannah gave birth to their fourth child, Isaac Worley Till, around January 1778. Hannah accompanied General Washington on his military campaigns for six and a half years and also worked for the Marquis de Lafayette for six months. Between her two employers, she was present at all the battles they fought in the American Revolutionary War.

Hannah and Isaac saved enough to purchase their freedom on October 30, 1778, according to some sources. Another source states records show Hannah became free in December of that year. Hannah continued to work for Washington as a paid cook.

== Post-Revolution ==
The Tills moved to Philadelphia, Pennsylvania, where they were members of the First African Presbyterian Church. Hannah continue to work as a cook.

Hannah and Isaac Till had seven children together, the other three being Daniel (born between 1775-1795), Philip (born 1775-1795) and William Till (born 1780-1790).

On a return trip to Philadelphia during his 1824–1825 tour of the United States, Lafayette visited Hannah, whom he referred to as "Aunt Hannah". He paid her mortgage after learning she was behind on payments.

John Fanning Watson interviewed the 102-year-old in March 1824 for an article in his Annals of Philadelphia.

== Death and legacy ==
Hannah died in 1826 at the age of 104. She was first interred in the First African Presbyterian Church graveyard at Seventh and Bainbridge Streets in Philadelphia. The graveyard was sold and her remains were moved Lebanon Cemetery in South Philadelphia. After Lebanon Cemetery was also sold, her remains were moved once more, to Eden Cemetery in Collingdale, Pennsylvania, where she rests today.

October 3, 2015, the Daughters of the American Revolution erected a marker near her gravesite to recognize her contributions. A DAR chapter is also named in her honor.
