= Lewis M. Mintess =

American politician

Pennsylvania House of Representatives

Member of the U.S. House of Representatives from 's Sixth district
- In office 1943–1944
- Preceded by: Edward C. Young
- Succeeded by: Moe Trachtman
- In office 1947–1952
- Preceded by: Moe Trachtman
- Succeeded by: Scholley Pace Alexander

Personal details
- Born: December 26, 1895 Philadelphia, Pennsylvania, U.S.
- Died: July 24, 1982 (aged 86) Philadelphia, Pennsylvania, U.S.
- Resting place: Eden Cemetery, Collingdale, Pennsylvania, U.S.
- Party: Republican

Lewis Meade Mintess (December 26, 1895 – July 24, 1982) was a state legislator in Pennsylvania. He was a medic in World War I and worked in government jobs before starting his political career. He served four terms representing Philadelphia in the Pennsylvania House of Representatives between the years 1942 and 1952.

== Early life and education ==
Mintess was born December 26, 1895 in Philadelphia to Lewis Meade and Sarah (née Ross) Mintess. He went to school in the Downingtown Independent School, then Lincoln University, before going to the Medico-Chirurgical College of Philadelphia to study medicine.

His mother died March 6, 1917, and his father died the following year on May 1, 1918 with both buried in Eden Cemetery.

He served during World War I in the medical section of 813th Infantry.

== Career ==
After the war he held positions working in government offices first as a typist in the office of the Recorder of Deeds from 1924 to 1934, and then in the Receiver of City Taxes department.

Mintess became active in the states Republican Party and was the chairman of the Republican Executive Committee for the 7th Ward.

He was first elected to the Pennsylvania House of Representatives as a Republican in 1942 serving from 1943 to 1944. During this first session he co-introduce, with black Democrat Thomas P. Trent, a bill to prohibit organisations from discriminating based on rare, color or creed. In 1944 he ran for re-election but lost to Democrat Moe Trachtman.

He was re-elected in 1946 and served the next three consecutive terms from 1947 to 1952. During the 1947-1948 session he was appointed to the Joint Legislative Committee on Juvenile Delinquency and Child Welfare. He ran for a final time in 1952 but was unsuccessful losing to Scholley Pace Alexander by a few hundred votes.

== Death ==
Mintess died July 24, 1982 in Philadelphia and was interred in Eden Cemetery in Collingdale, Pennsylvania.

== See also ==
- List of African-American officeholders (1900–1959)
