= Pauline Oberdorfer Minor =

American educator and singer (1895–1963)

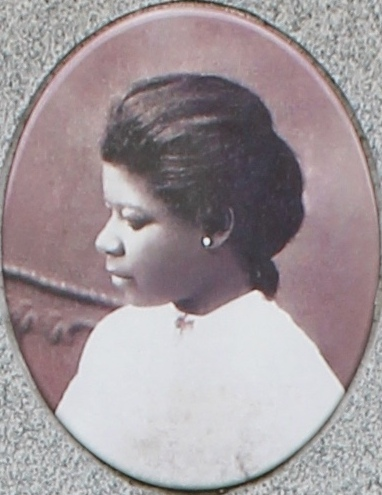
- Born: Pauline Richardson Oberdorfer; February 18, 1895; Charlottesville, Virginia, U.S.
- Died: January 23, 1963 (aged 67); Philadelphia, Pennsylvania, U.S.
- Resting place: Eden Cemetery, Collingdale, Pennsylvania, U.S.
- Education: Howard University Teacher's College, A.B. 1914
- Occupations: Educator, composer
- Known for: Co-founder of Delta Sigma Theta

Pauline Richardson Oberdorfer Minor (February 18, 1895 – January 23, 1963) was an African American teacher, singer, and composer. She was one of the founders of the Delta Sigma Theta sorority. She was a mezzo-soprano recitalist and composer of hymns, who published several books.

== Early life ==
Oberdorfer was born on February 18, 1895 in Charlottesville, Virginia. Her mother, Margaret A Richardson, worked as a washerwoman. She did not know her father. To further her education, she was sent to live with her aunt, Cora Richardson, and uncle in Philadelphia, Pennsylvania. In 1910, she graduated from the Philadelphia High School for Girls. Oberdorfer was a member of the Union Baptist Church in Philadelphia. After high school, she lived with her mother and sister in Charlottesville.

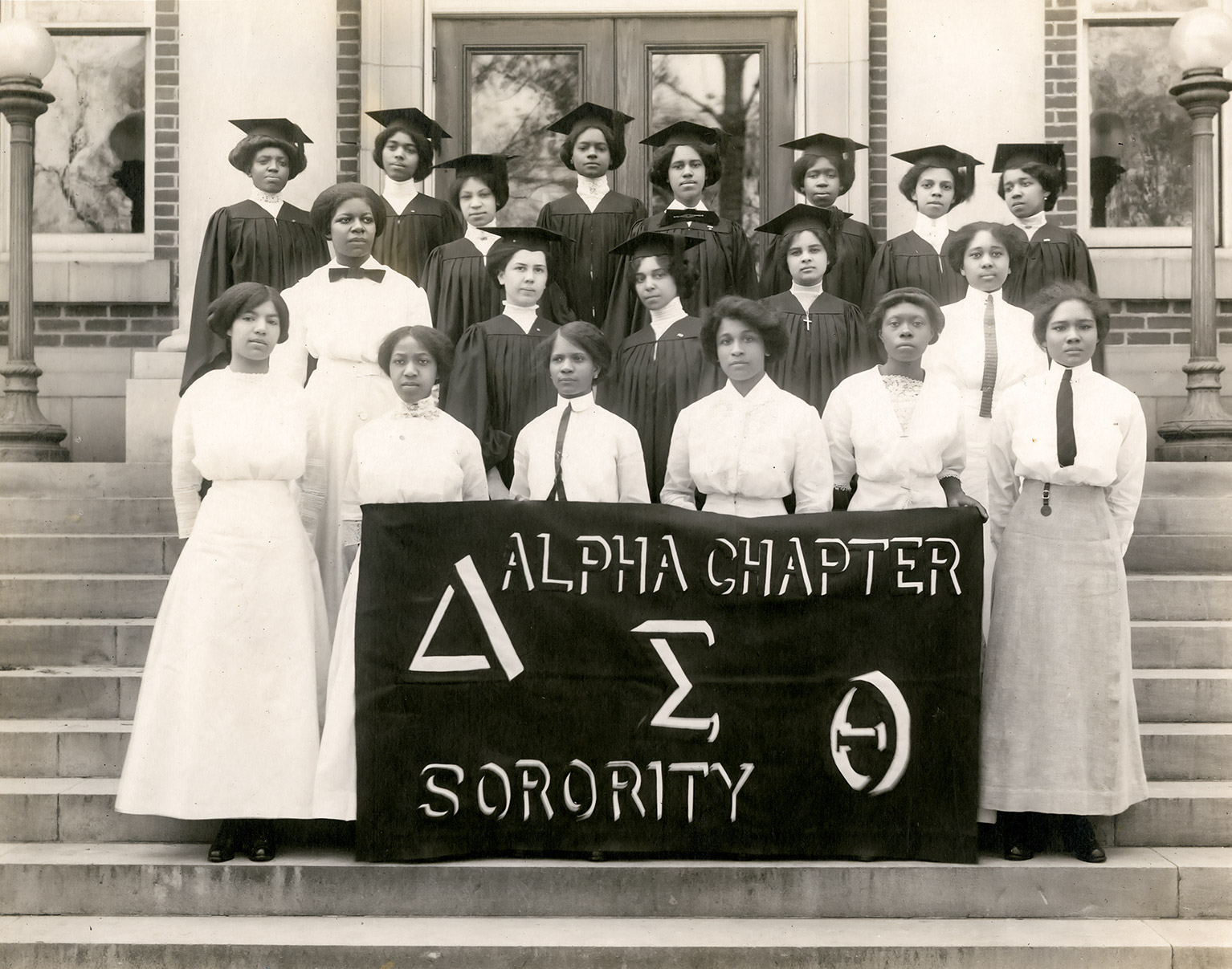
Oberdorfer (middle row, left), along with other founders of Delta Sigma Theta in 1913

Oberdorfer received a church scholarship to attend Howard University Teacher's College. At Howard, she joined the Alpha Kappa Alpha sorority and served as its treasurer. Disappointed that Alpha Kappa Alpha's focus was on social activities rather than service and women's advancement, Oberdorfer and 22 fellow students co-founded the Delta Sigma Theta sorority on January 13, 1913. She served as the first treasurer of the sorority's Alpha chapter. On March 3, 1913, the Oberdorfer and her sorority participated in the Woman Suffrage Procession in Washington, D.C.

Oberdorfer graduated with an A.B. in education cum laude in 1914 and was the valedictorian of her class. She was also her class prophet and wrote the class poem.

== Career ==
After college, Oberdorfer taught at the Avery Normal Institute in Charleston, South Carolina and Ocean City, New Jersey. In 1923, she began teaching the opportunity class at the Gay Street Elementary School in West Chester, Pennsylvania. In 1927, she served on the executive committee of the Association of Teachers of Colored Children in the Schools of Pennsylvania. She also taught in Charlottesville, Virginia and in Alabama.

Oberdorfer had a secondary career as a mezzo-soprano recitalist and composer of hymns and spirituals. She published two books in 1932: Faith. I Wonder How When Bound in Sin etc. and Witness Within. Once I was a Sinner etc. Her book, Soul Echoes featured forty of her compositions including "Get Off the Judgment Seat" and "My Lord Is a Refuge".

She was a housekeeper at the time of her death.

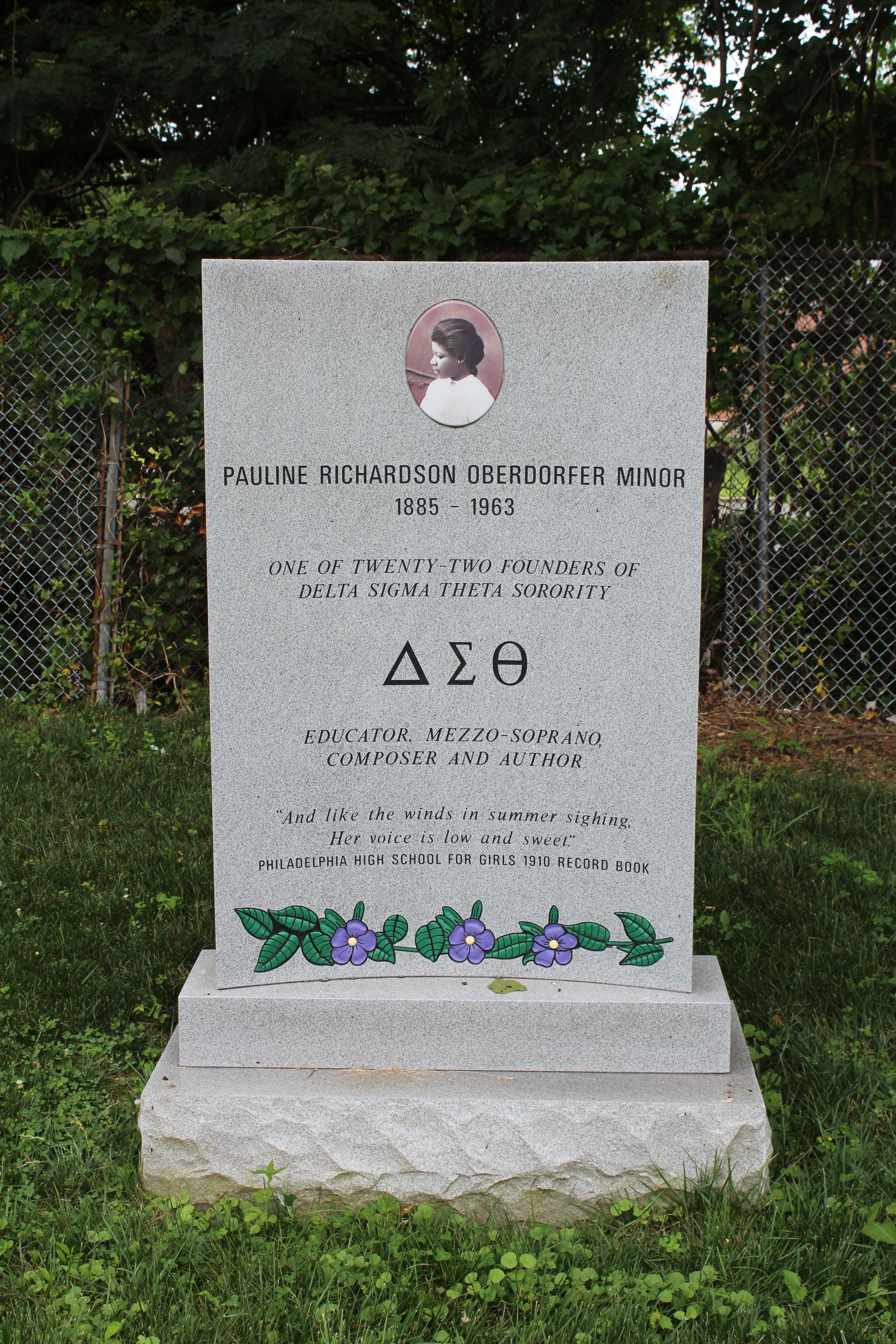
Gravestone installed by Delta Sigma Theta in Eden Cemetery

== Personal life ==
Oberdorfer married William Minor in Philadelphia in 1938; they later divorced. She died on January 23, 1963 in the Presbyterian Hospital of Philadelphia. She was buried in a pauper's grave alongside three other people in Eden Cemetery in Collingdale, Pennsylvania.

== Legacy ==
On March 28, 2015, members of Delta Sigma Theta gave Oberdorfer an Omega Omega funeral service, after a long search for her burial place. The Philadelphia alumnae chapter of the Delta Sigma Theta also erected a monument for Oberdorfer in Eden Cemetery.

Delta Sigma Theta chapters established a scholarship at the Philadelphia High School for Girls and a college internship in Charlottesville, Virginia, in her name.
