= Robert Penn (Medal of Honor) =

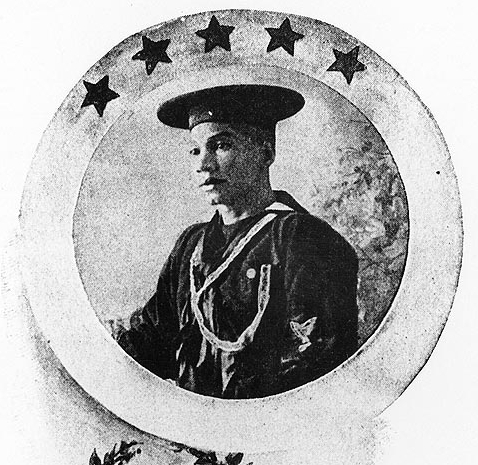
- Fireman First Class Robert Penn
- Born: October 10, 1872; City Point, Virginia, US
- Died: June 8, 1912 (aged 39); Las Animas, Colorado
- Burial place: Eden Cemetery (Collingdale, Pennsylvania)
- Military career
- Allegiance: United States of America
- Branch: United States Navy
- Rank: Fireman First Class
- Unit: USS Iowa (BB-4)
- Conflicts: Spanish–American War
- Awards: Medal of Honor

Robert Penn (October 10, 1872 – June 8, 1912) was a United States Navy sailor and a recipient of America's highest military decoration—the Medal of Honor—for his actions during the Spanish–American War.

== Biography ==
On July 20, 1898, Penn was serving as a Fireman First Class on the USS Iowa (BB-4) off the coast of Santiago de Cuba when a boiler accident occurred. For his actions during the incident, Penn was issued the Medal of Honor five months later, on December 14, 1898.

He died in Las Animas, Colorado and is interred at Eden Cemetery in Collingdale, Pennsylvania.

== Medal of Honor citation ==
Fireman Penn's official Medal of Honor citation reads:

On board the U.S.S. Iowa off Santiago de Cuba, 20 July 1898. Performing his duty at the risk of serious scalding at the time of the blowing out of the manhole gasket on board the vessel, Penn hauled the fire while standing on a board thrown across a coal bucket 1 foot above the boiling water which was still blowing from the boiler.

== See also ==
- List of Medal of Honor recipients
- List of African American Medal of Honor recipients
- List of Medal of Honor recipients for the Spanish–American War
