= Eden Cemetery (Collingdale, Pennsylvania) =

Historic cemetery in Collingdale, Pennsylvania

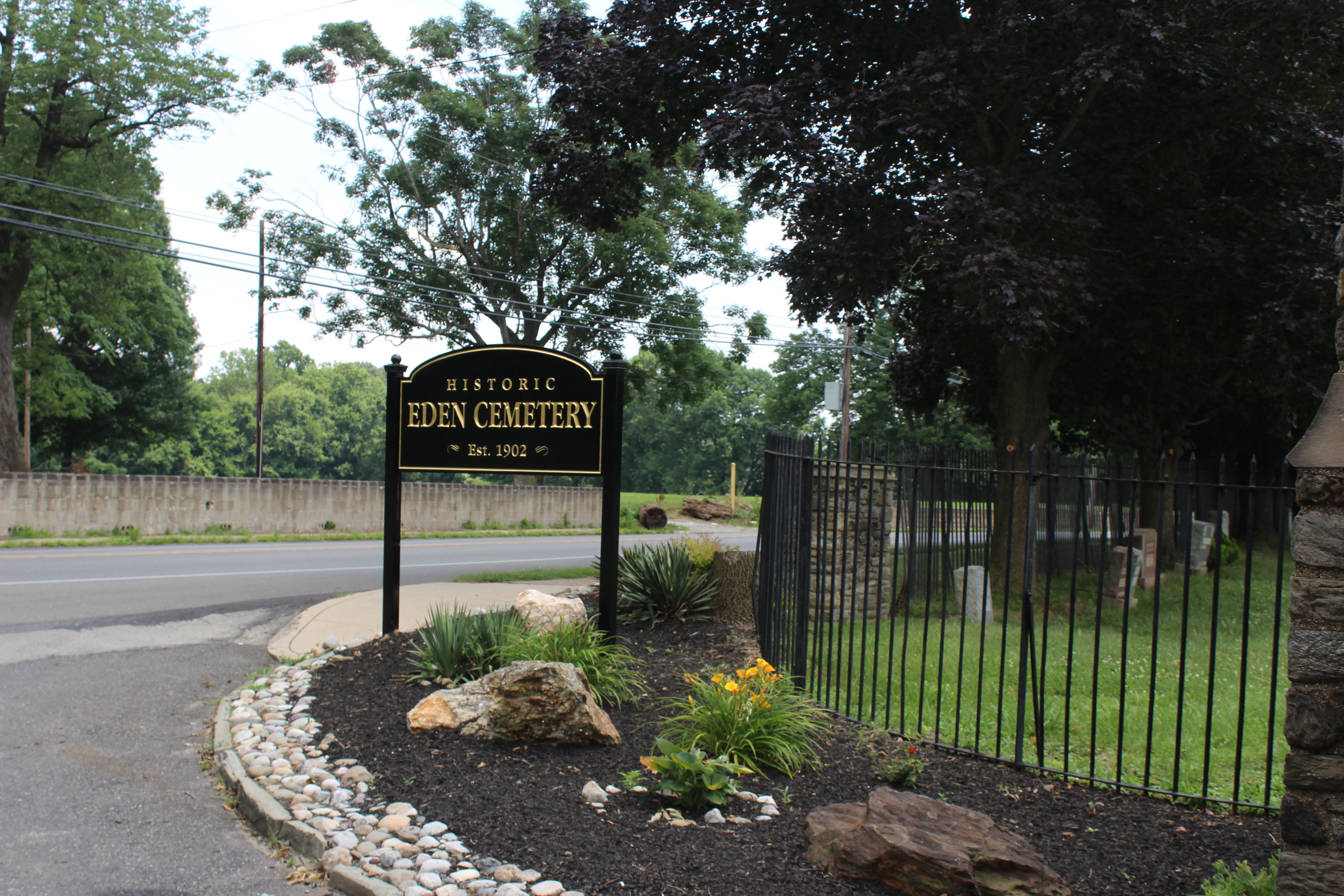
- Eden Cemetery Entrance
- Interactive map of Eden Cemetery

Details
- Established: 1902
- Location: 1434 Springfield Road, Collingdale, Pennsylvania, US
- Country: United States
- Type: private
- Size: 53 acres (21 ha)
- No. of graves: 93,000
- Website: Official website
- Eden Cemetery
- U.S. National Register of Historic Places
- Location within Pennsylvania Location within the United States
- Coordinates: 39°55′20″N 75°16′24″W
- NRHP reference No.: 10001031
- Added to NRHP: December 13, 2010

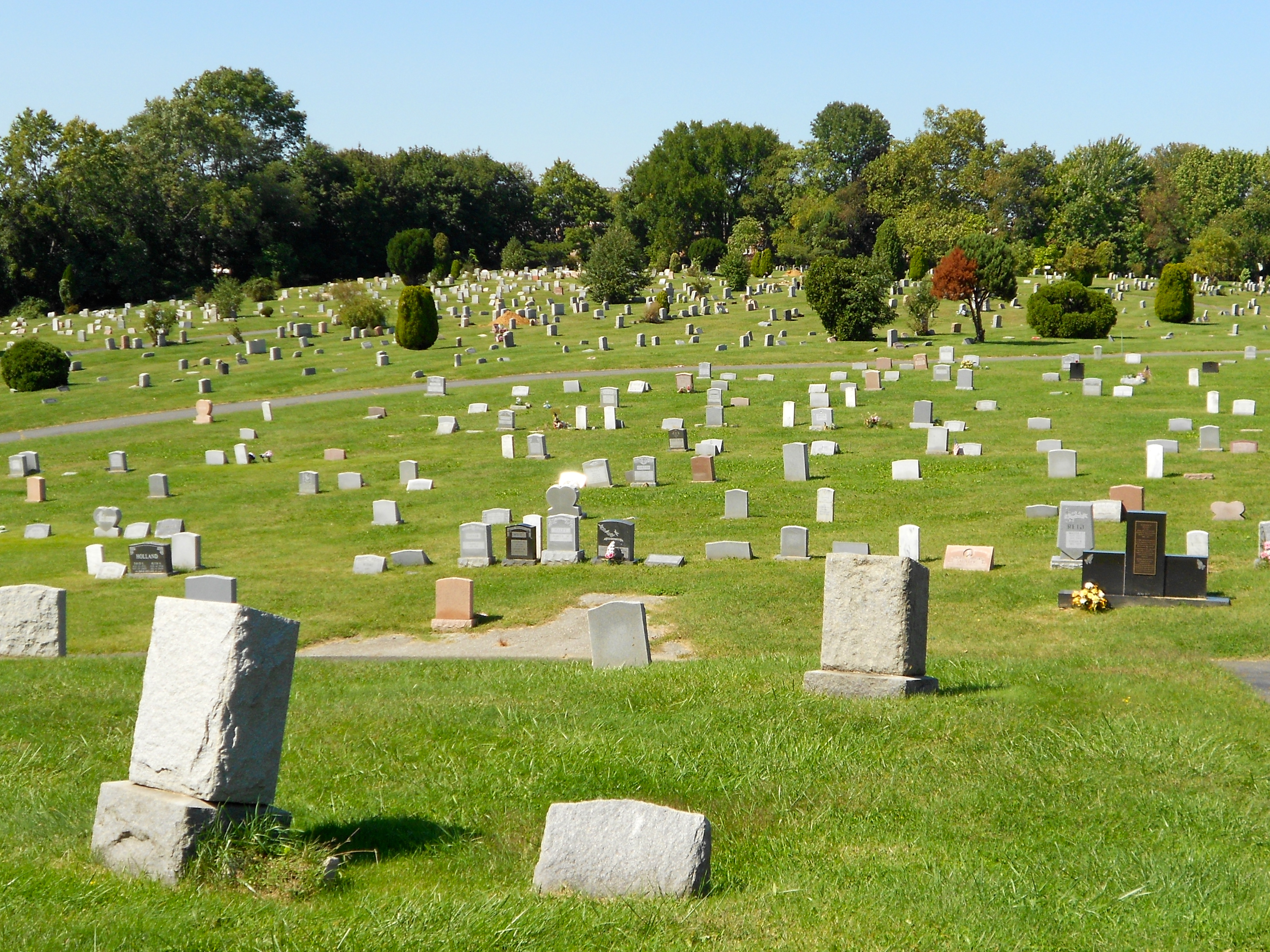
Eden Cemetery

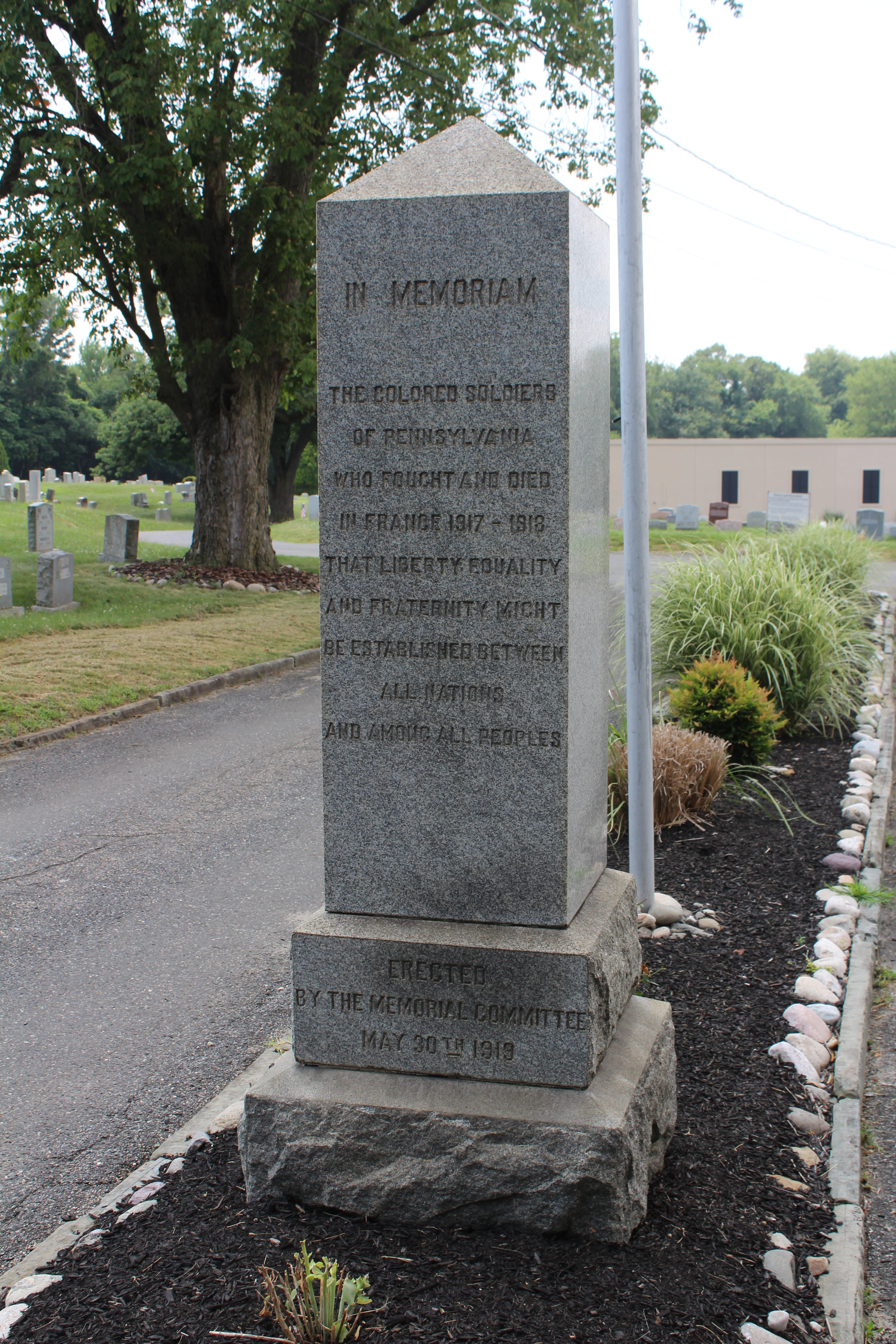
World War I Pennsylvania Colored Soldier Memorial in Eden Cemetery

Eden Cemetery is a historic African-American cemetery located in Collingdale, Pennsylvania, United States. It was established June 20, 1902, and is the oldest existing black owned cemetery in the United States. The cemetery covers about 53 acres and contains approximately 93,000 burials.

== History ==
Jerome Bacon, an instructor at the Institute for Colored Youth (the precursor to Cheyney University), led efforts to create a cemetery for African-Americans who had been buried in cemeteries in Philadelphia that were being condemned by the city in the early 20th century. The cemeteries included Lebanon Cemetery (condemned in 1899 – closed in 1903), the Olive Graveyard (closed in 1923), the Stephen Smith Home for the Aged and Infirm Colored Person's Burial Ground and the First African Baptist Church Burial Grounds. The bodies buried in these cemeteries were disinterred and re-interred at Eden Cemetery. The oldest reburial in the cemetery is from 1721.

After litigation from Collingdale opposing the creation of an African-American cemetery in the township, a charter for the creation of Eden Cemetery was granted by Pennsylvania on June 20, 1902. Fifty-three acres of land previously part of Bartram Farms were selected for the creation of the cemetery.

The first meeting of the cemetery charter committee was held on August 9, 1902, and included prominent members of Philadelphia's black community in the following roles:

- President – John C. Asbury, lawyer
- Vice-president – Charles W. Jones
- Vice-president – Daniel C. Parvis, upholsterer
- Secretary – Jerome Bacon, instructor at the Institute for Colored Youth (the precursor to Cheyney University)
- Treasurer – Martin J. Lehmann, cigar maker

The first interment at the cemetery was delayed until nightfall due to local white protestors who blocked the cemetery entrance during the day. The headline of the Chester County Times the next day read "Collingdale Has More Race Troubles, Town Council Has No Use for a Colored Cemetery, No African Need Apply."

On May 30, 1919, a memorial was erected to commemorate the African American soldiers from Pennsylvania who fought and died in France during World War I from 1917 to 1918.

In 1986, five child victims of the 1985 MOVE bombing were interred in two unmarked graves at Eden Cemetery.

In July 2008, vandals toppled over 200 headstones in the cemetery, including that of Octavius Valentine Catto, one of the most famous burials at Eden Cemetery.

In 2010, Eden Cemetery was listed on the National Register of Historic Places. The cemetery is still in operation and maintained by a group of volunteers.

In 2015, a monument to Pauline Oberdorfer Minor was erected in Eden Cemetery by the Philadelphia Alumnae chapter of the Delta Sigma Theta sorority She was one of the 22 founders of the Sorority but was working as a housekeeper when she died and was interred in a pauper's grave alongside three other people.

In January 2024, the skulls of 19 unidentified African American Philadelphians were interred in two mausolea in Eden Cemetery. The skulls were part of the Penn Museum collection and were most likely from enslaved persons from the 1830s and 1840s. The skulls were collected by Samuel George Morton, a scientist who supported scientific racism.

== Notable burials ==
- Julian Abele (1881–1950), architect

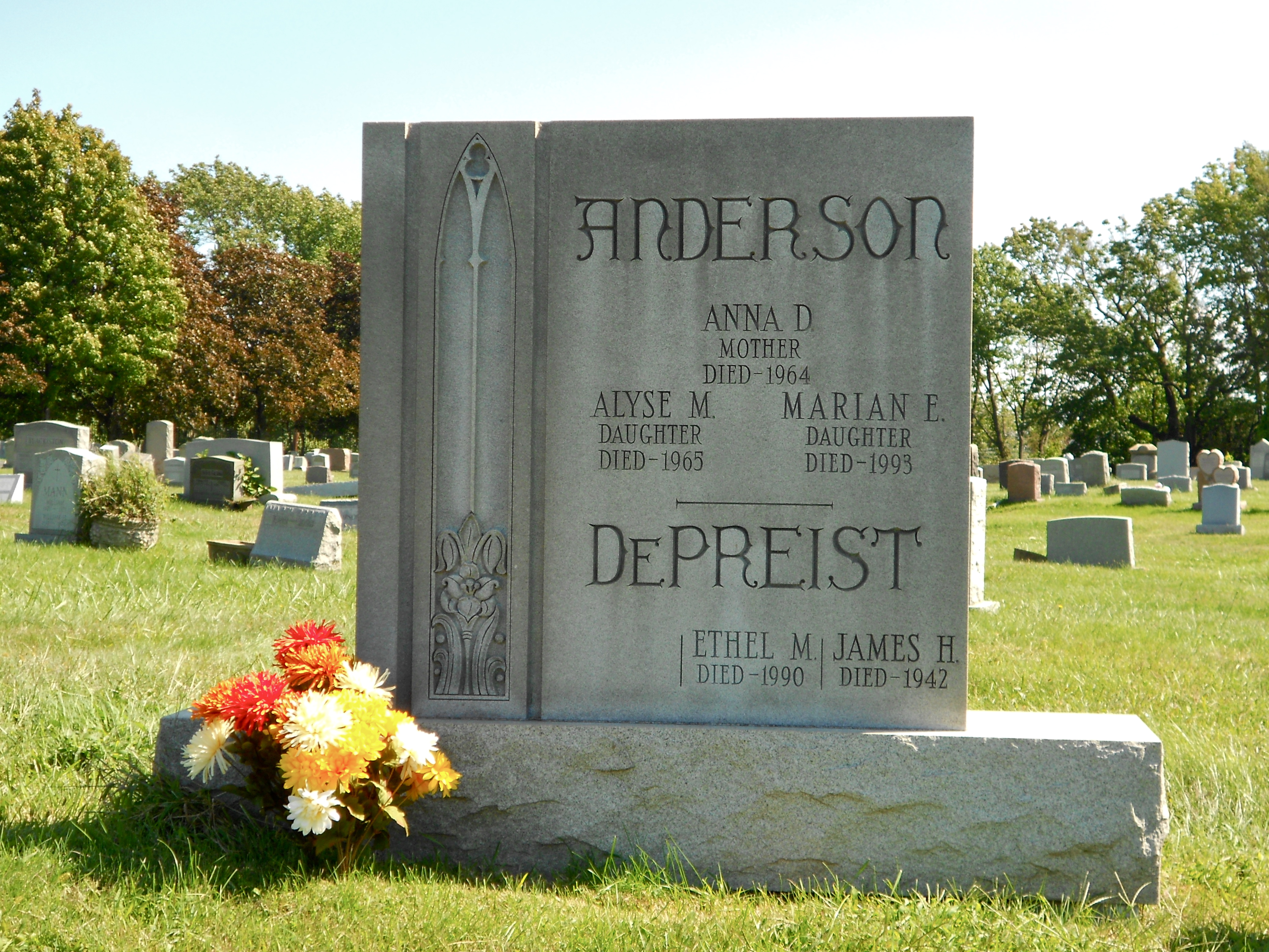
Marian Anderson gravestone

- Marian Anderson (1897–1993), opera singer
- Ruth L. Bennett (1866–1947), Social reformer and first president of the Chester branch of the NAACP
- John C. Bowers (1811–1873), entrepreneur, organist, abolitionist
- David Bustill Bowser (1820–1900), ornamental artist and portraitist
- John Pierre Burr (c. 1792–1864), abolitionist and community leader in Philadelphia, a son of Aaron Burr
- Cyrus Bustill (1732–1806), abolitionist and community leader
- Octavius Valentine Catto (1839–1871), civil rights leader, baseball pioneer (originally buried in Lebanon Cemetery, Philadelphia; transferred to Eden, May 14, 1903)
- Dr. Rebecca J Cole (1846–1922), the second African-American female to earn the Doctor of Medicine degree in the United States.
- Frank T. Coleman (1911–2008), educator and community volunteer
- William A. Creditt (1864–1921), minister, educator, civil rights activist, and school founder
- Emilie Davis (1839–1889), diarist
- James DePreist (1936–2013), orchestra conductor
- Sarah Mapps Douglass (1806–1882), abolitionist, educator and writer
- Henrietta Duterte (1817–1903), funeral home owner, philanthropist, and abolitionist
- Tyrone Everett (1953–1977), Philadelphia professional boxer
- Jessie Redmon Fauset (1882–1961), editor, poet, essayist and novelist
- James Forten (1766–1842), African-American abolitionist and businessman
- Timothy Thomas Fortune (1856–1928), journalist, civil rights leader
- Stanislaus Kostka Govern (1854–1924), West Indian–American baseball player, first manager of the Cuban Giants, labor organizer, journalist, and Shakespearean actor
- Frances Harper (1825–1911), poet, abolitionist
- Edwin C. J. T. Howard (1846–1912), physician
- Francis "Frank" Johnson (1792–1844) pioneering musician whose compositions foreshadowed jazz
- Absalom Jones (1746–1818), African-American abolitionist and clergyman, reinterred to St. Thomas African Episcopal Church in Philadelphia, Pennsylvania
- Caroline LeCount (1846–1923), civil rights activist and educator
- Harry McGilberry (1950–2006), R&B and Soul singer

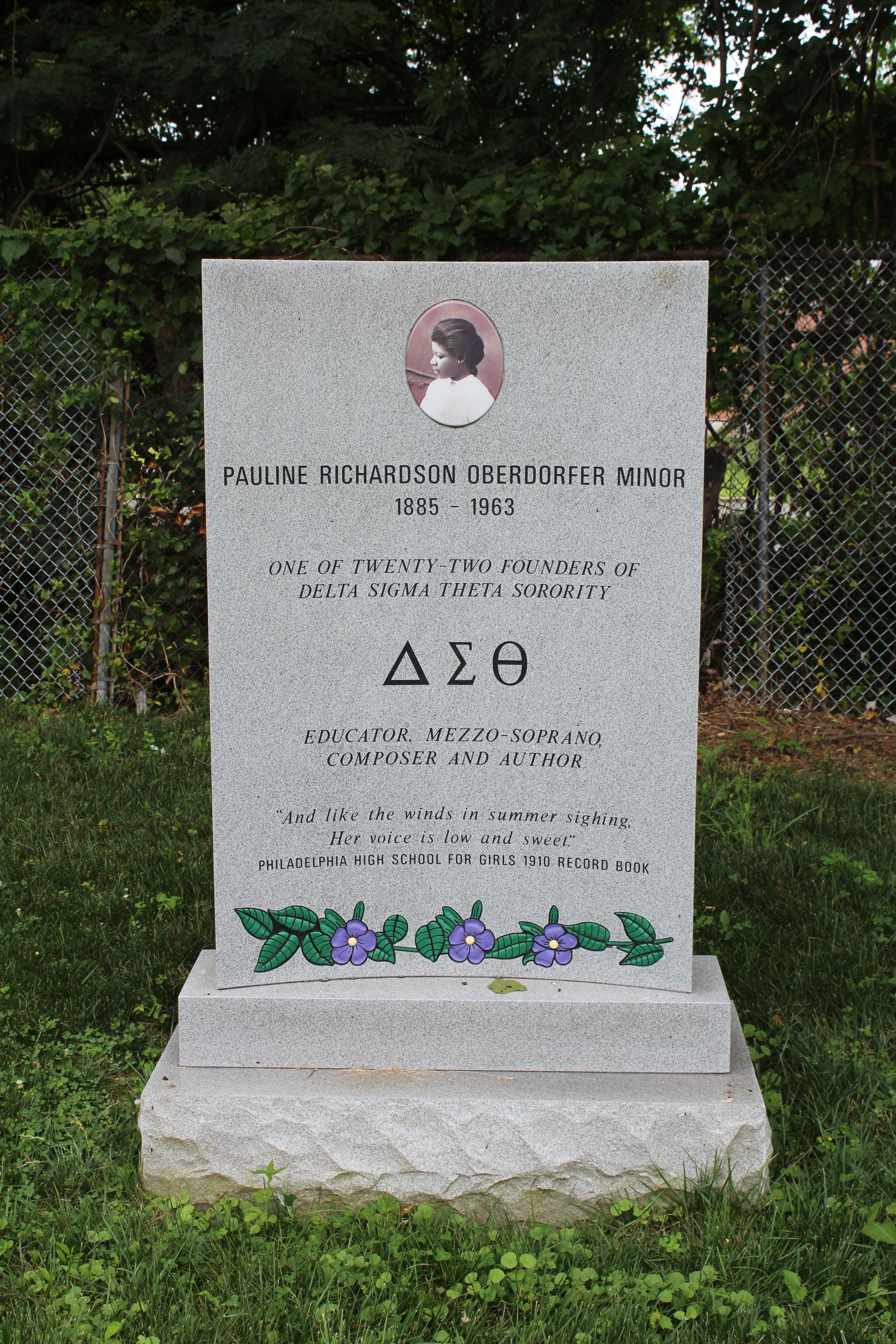
Pauline Richardson Oberdorfer Minor memorial near her pauper's grave she shares with three other burials

- Pauline Oberdorfer Minor (1885–1963) a Founder of Delta Sigma Theta sorority
- Lewis M. Mintess (1895–1982), state legislator who served four terms in the Pennsylvania House of Representatives
- John Bunyan Reeve (1831–1916), Presbyterian minister and professor at Howard University
- Robert Penn (1872–1912), Spanish–American War Medal of Honor Recipient
- William Still (1821–1902), abolitionist
- Elizabeth Stumm (1857–1910) also known as Elizabeth Height, teacher, and journalist
- John Baxter Taylor, Jr. (1882–1908), track and field athlete, first African-American Olympic Gold Medalist
- Hannah Archer Till (c. 1721–1826), personal cook of George Washington and Gilbert du Motier, Marquis de Lafayette during the American Revolutionary War.

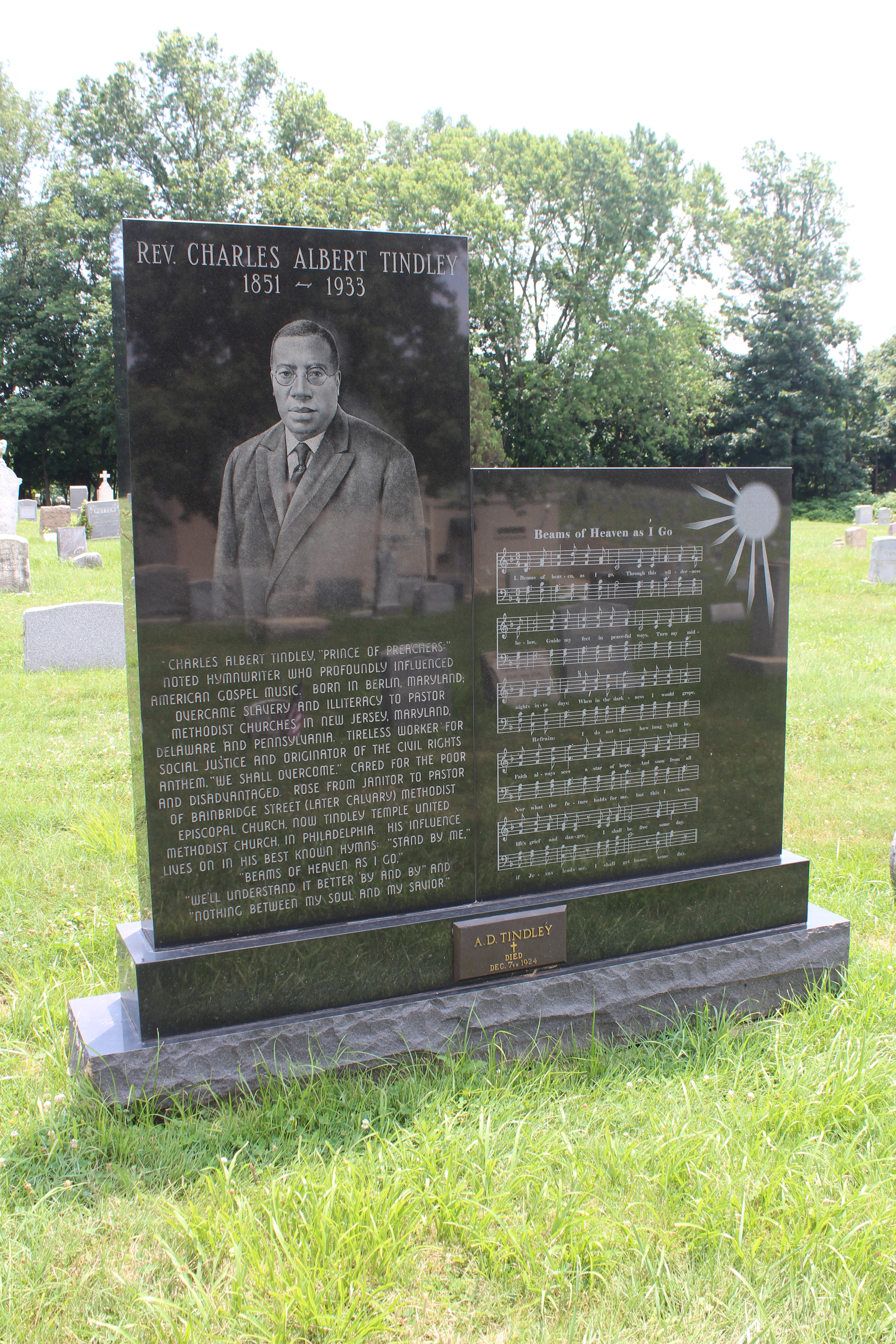
Charles Albert Tindley gravestone

- Charles Albert Tindley (1851–1933), minister, composer
- Laura Wheeler Waring (1887–1948), artist and educator
- George Henry White (1852–1918), US Congressman from North Carolina
