= Elizabeth Greenfield =

American singer (1809–1876)

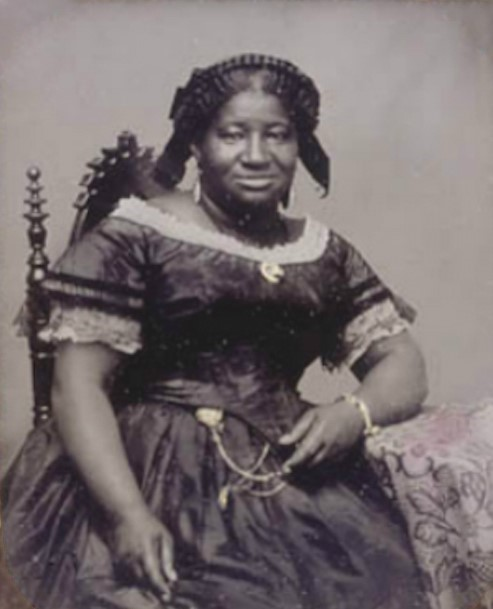

Background information
- Born: c. 1817; Natchez, Mississippi
- Died: March 31, 1876 (aged 58–59) Philadelphia, Pennsylvania
- Instrument: voice
- Years active: 1845–1863

Elizabeth Taylor Greenfield (1817 – March 31, 1876), dubbed "The Black Swan" (a play on Jenny Lind's sobriquet, "The Swedish Nightingale" and Catherine Hayes's "The Irish Swan"), was an American singer considered the best-known Black concert artist of her time. She was lauded by James M. Trotter for her "remarkably sweet tones and wide vocal compass". Trotter described her as the first African American concert singer, which has been repeated through many biographies.

== Early life ==
Greenfield was born into slavery in Natchez, Mississippi, sometime between 1808 and 1826 to Anna Greenfield and a man whose name may have been "Taylor." According to an 1854 article in The Tri-Weekly Commercial, "her mother was of Indian descent, her father an African." Not much is known about her family, though her will referenced a sister, Mary Parker, and nieces and nephews.

In the early 1820s, Greenfield's enslaver, Elizabeth H. Greenfield, a former plantation owner, moved to Philadelphia after divorcing her second husband and manumitted her slaves. E. H. Greenfield worked with the American Emancipation Society to send 18 formerly enslaved residents of the Greenfield plantation, including Anna Greenfield and two of her daughters, to Liberia on August 2, 1831, aboard the brig Criterion.

Greenfield remained in Philadelphia, becoming well acquainted with her upper-class white neighbors. She lived with E. H. Greenfield until she was about eight years old, then attending Clarkson School, a private, Quaker school, probably living with relatives. She studied music as a child, encouraged by E. H. Greenfield, although musical education was not generally provided by the Quakers with whom she associated. (While some sources state that E. H. Greenfield was herself a Quaker, others state only that she attended Quaker meetings "occasionally" and supported the Society of Friends financially.) She returned to live with E. H. Greenfield in 1836 to take care of her. This may have been a situation of indentured service, though E. H. Greenfield paid her wages, which was uncommon in these situations. After E. H. Greenfield's death in 1845, Greenfield was shut out of her inheritance. She established herself as a music teacher in Philadelphia before moving to Buffalo in 1851, where she had relatives and friends. According to one biographical account, she was discovered when compelled to sing on the boat ride to Buffalo.

== Career ==
=== Early career ===
In about 1851, Greenfield began to sing at private parties, debuting at the Buffalo Musical Association under the patronage of Electa and Herman B. Potter. After her initial success in Buffalo and Rochester, she may have been briefly managed by two African American men from Philadelphia, but in 1851, she took on agent Colonel J. H. Wood, a P. T. Barnum-style promoter and supporter of the Fugitive Slave Act of 1850, who would not allow Black patrons into her concerts. According to an 1853 exposé by Martin Delany, Wood took advantage of Greenfield professionally, handling her money and keeping her in a state of near slavery and isolation.

Greenfield toured the East Coast and the Midwest from 1851 to 1853. In 1852, she toured in Canada, where she was likely the first Black woman to sing art music professionally. She was held up by abolitionists as an example of the success that former slaves might realize. However, she was also followed by racist and pro-slavery news coverage. Some news outlets accused of her being a minstrel performer in blackface, which led to incidents of laughter and comic portrayal at her serious performances. Minstrel acts went on to use her as inspiration, with minstrel "Black Swan"s being staged through the 1870s. Following the tour, Greenfield lived briefly with Hiram E. Howard's family in Buffalo, helping raise their son who was later nicknamed "Greenfield" in her honor (particularly unique for a white child). Howard and Eli Cook helped Greenfield arrange her European tour in April of that year. Allegedly, around this time, Barnum offered to represent Greenfield.

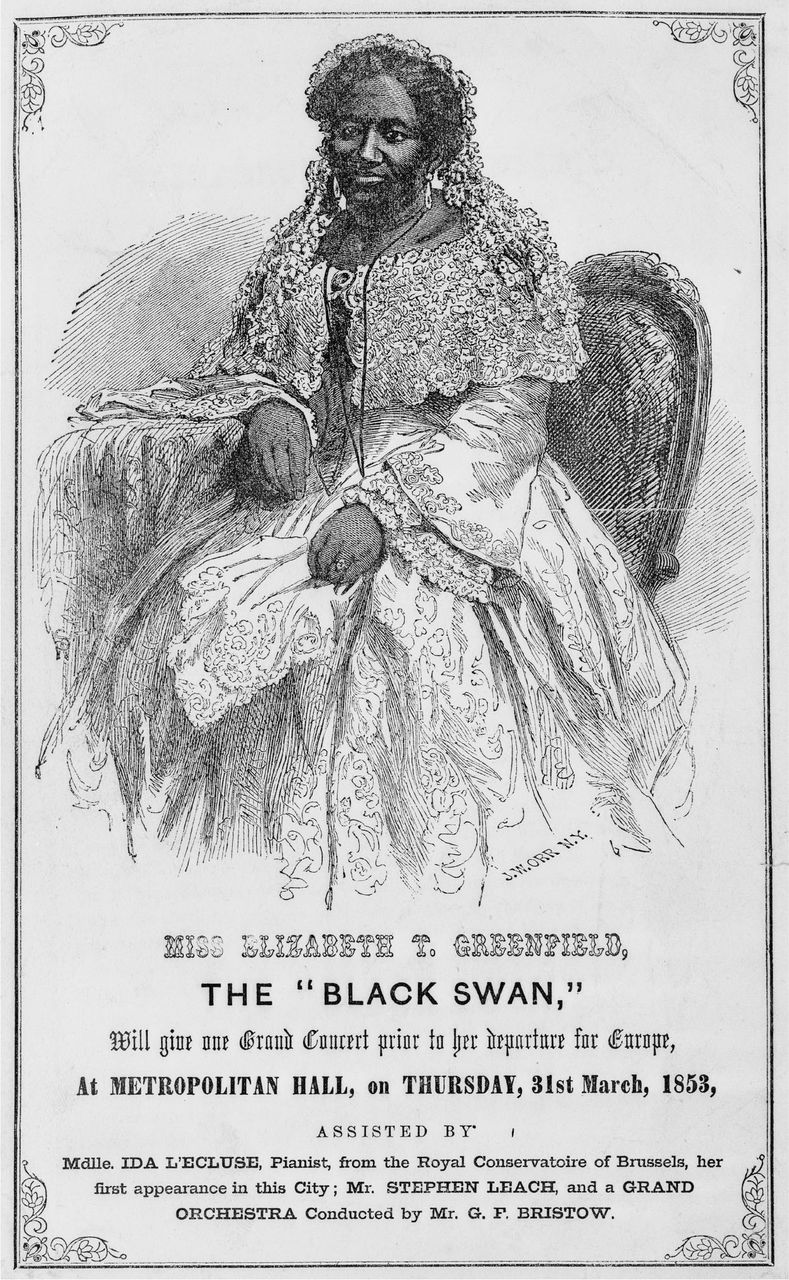
Playbill for Elizabeth Taylor Greenfield's performance at Metropolitan Hall

=== Concert at Metropolitan Hall ===
On March 31, 1853, Greenfield debuted at Metropolitan Hall in New York City, which held an audience of 4,000. The day before the concert, the New-York Tribune published "Particular Notice – No colored persons can be admitted, as there has been no part of the house appropriated for them," leading to uproar in the city. Before the concert, there were rumors that there would be white supremacist riots and a threat of arson. Even at the concert, Greenfield experienced prejudice, with the audience laughing as she took the stage and her escort onto the stage keeping his distance.

Following this concert, Greenfield was greatly criticized for not realizing her social importance. After the concert, Greenfield apologized to her own people for their exclusion from the performance and gave a concert to benefit the Home of Aged Colored Persons and the Colored Orphan Asylum.

=== England ===
In March 1853, a testimonial concert in Buffalo funded a trip to Europe for additional training. However, a London manager defaulted, leaving her stranded. She contacted British abolitionist Lord Shaftesbury and American author Harriet Beecher Stowe for help, and was introduced to the abolitionist elite. The noted abolitionist Duchess of Sutherland became Greenfield's patron. Concert promoter Robert W. Olliver handled the business, and singers Italo Gardoni and Charles Cotton were hired to support her. Greenfield premiered in London at Hanover Square Rooms on May 31, 1853. She played at Birmingham Town Hall on June 23. Accounts disagree regarding her success in England, with Kurt Gänzl noting "Some versions of 'history' of course, would have it otherwise, and I have read pieces about the lady speaking of her 'popularity' and her 'success' in Britain. It simply was not so. The time of the black vocalist – and certainly not a black vocalist as unprepared as this one – had not yet come."

Sutherland introduced Greenfield to Queen Victoria's Chapel Royal organist, George Thomas Smart. She charmed Smart, who took her on as a student and presented her in concert. She gave a command performance for the queen at Buckingham Palace on May 10, 1854; she was the first African American performer to perform before British royalty. Queen Victoria paid her twenty pounds, passage for her to return to the United States. Harriet Beecher Stowe wrote about Greenfield's appearance before the "elite" English society in Sunny Memories of Foreign Lands.

=== Post-England career ===
In the United States, Greenfield reconnected with Wood, though with a strong stance against his discriminatory practices, though circumstances still required her to frequently sing at segregated venues. Following her return from England, she performed many charity concerts, many supporting Black churches and schools, which were widely popular and raised considerable funds. By 1855, she was hailed as an inspirational figure for both free and enslaved Blacks. In the late 1850s, some of her charitable work became controversial, as she raised money for African missions, expeditions, and aid for Liberian settlers, largely colonialist causes.

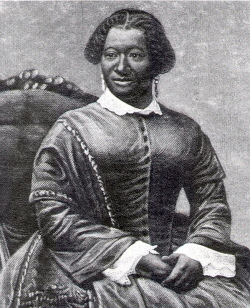
Portrait of Elizabeth Greenfield

Greenfield toured the United States again in 1854, 1856, and 1863, sometimes with Thomas Bowers, who became known as "The Colored Mario" and "The American Mario" for the similarity of his voice to Italian opera tenor Giovanni Mario. Her concerts brought her to Maryland, which, as a slave state, was particularly dangerous. These concerts were incredibly successful, though, with newspapers around the North describing them as progress toward abolition. Throughout her tours, southern newspapers denied her success or twisted it into pro-slavery propaganda, describing her in grotesquely racist language.

In her 1863 tour, Greenfield's concert featured many political songs. During the American Civil War, she continued performing charity concerts in the North and raised funds to support Black Union soldiers. She also performed for Black soldiers. After 1866, she performed at churches in the South. After 1863, Greenfield occasionally performed, often to benefit African American causes. She was praised as an exceptional Black achiever, with James McCune Smith claiming "The colored man must do impracticable things before he is admitted to a place in society. He must speak like a Douglass, write like a Dumas, and sing like the Black Swan before he could be recognized as a human being." She was included in each of Philadelphia's Social, Civil and Statistical Association of the Colored People of Pennsylvania's lecture series (likely volunteering her time) as an integral part of the program, and accompanying key speeches. Notably, she performed preceding a lecture by Frederick Douglass.

Greenfield was also popular in Toronto, Canada, appearing several times in the 1850s at the Royal Lyceum.

== Later life and death ==
Settling in Philadelphia, Greenfield ran a music studio and promoted Black singers. Among her voice pupils was Thomas Bowers. She was a member of the Philadelphia Shiloh Baptist Church, and directed its choir. In the 1860s she created an opera troupe, the Black Swan Opera Troupe, with Bowers, which she directed. By 1868, she was listed as a "music critic" among professors supporting The Christian Recorder. Greenfield died in Philadelphia of paralysis on March 31, 1876. In the early 1920s, Harry Pace established Black Swan Records, named after Greenfield.

== Repertoire and vocal range ==
Best known for her performances of the music of George Frideric Handel, Wolfgang Amadeus Mozart, Gioachino Rossini, Giacomo Meyerbeer, Vincenzo Bellini, and Gaetano Donizetti, she also performed sentimental American songs such as Henry Bishop's 1852 setting of John Howard Payne's "Home! Sweet Home!" and Stephen Foster's "Old Folks at Home". Her repertoire also included "I'm Free," a piece written for her by Charles William Glover.

Greenfield performed in both masculine and feminine vocal registers as a soprano and a tenor. Her vocal compass gave her entry into both Black and white cultural spaces.
