= Frank Coleman (counselor) =

American educator and community volunteer

Frank C. Coleman
- Born: February 29, 1912; Philadelphia, Pennsylvania, US
- Died: December 25, 2008 (aged 96); Philadelphia, Pennsylvania, US
- Resting place: Eden Cemetery (Collingdale, Pennsylvania)
- Other name: "Tick"
- Education: BA, Lincoln University; MA, University of Pennsylvania; PhD (Honorary), Lincoln University
- Known for: education
- Children: 2

Frank "Tick" Coleman (February 29, 1912 – December 25, 2008) was an educator and community volunteer. Born in Philadelphia, Coleman grew up in its Point Breeze neighborhood. He was one of the first black Eagle Scouts. Coleman is noted for supporting those institutions that helped him succeed and mentoring many youth in the city of Philadelphia.

== Early years ==
While at Logan Elementary School, he acquired the nickname "Tick" because his classmates said he could do things in a "few ticks of the clock." Because of segregation when Coleman was growing up in the 1920s, blacks were not allowed in at most city-run swimming pools. At that time, the YMCA was also segregated, so Coleman and his friends swam at the Christian Street YMCA, founded in the 1880s by African Americans in South Philadelphia. Coleman would then go on to serve the YMCA for more than 80 years.

Coleman first joined the Scouts in Troop 181 at a neighborhood Episcopal Church. This was in accordance with the wishes of his mother, who wanted him to have something to do after school.

Coleman persevered in Scouting despite the societal prejudices of the day. In a ceremony at the Union League, Coleman earned his Eagle rank in October 1926 at age 15 (one of the first three known black Eagle Scouts). At that time, he was a freshman at Central High School.

He was the first African American to quarterback Central High School's football team, leading his team to the Public League championships in 1929 and 1930. He also was the first African American member of the All Scholastic High School Football Team in 1928. His football helmet and shoes are on annual display at the African American Museum in Philadelphia.

Graduating from Central in 1931, he attended Lincoln University. While at Lincoln, he served as class president three times and as varsity football quarterback. He was a member of the wrestling team, manager of the varsity basketball team and sat on the Intramural Council.

He graduated from Lincoln University in 1935.

== Professional life ==
He started counseling and working with youth shortly after his graduation from Lincoln. Coleman worked for the School District of Philadelphia as a youth counselor for 32 years, retiring in 1981. He earned a master's degree in 1959 from the Penn School of Social Work. He was awarded an honorary doctoral degree in 1984 by Lincoln University.

== Community work ==
As a guidance counselor, and through Lincoln University, Coleman mentored hundreds of young people in the black community. He helped finance their education through scholarships that he funded.

He has been an active alumnus of Lincoln, and its football team. At Lincoln, he served as Director of Alumni Relations from 1981 to 1988 and as an alumni representative on the board of trustees for 10 years.

His involvement in the community has included the Philadelphia Christian Street YMCA, Wharton Settlement, Wissahickon Boys Club, Department of Public Assistance, Department of Recreation, Peace Corps, Salvation Army: Neighborhood Centre South, Wilmont Boys Club, Curtain Community Center, Southside Camp, and the Lansdowne Board of Education, the Greater Philadelphia Chapter of the National Society of Fundraising Executives, Omega Psi Phi fraternity alumni, the South Philadelphia Hebrew Center, and Commissioner of the National Old Timers Basketball League.

Coleman dedicated many years to bringing Scouting to underprivileged youth. To honor his years of service, the BSA created the Dr. Frank "Tick" Coleman National Service Award to honor paraprofessional Scouters. These Scouters serve underprivileged youth. In 2007 it was estimated that he was the oldest living black Eagle Scout.

== Honors ==
- Dr. Frank "Tick" Coleman Service Award, an award named in Coleman's honor.
- Omega Psi Phi Man of the Year
- Central High School William Butler Award for outstanding student athletes
- 2004 John Wanamaker Masonic Humanitarian Medal, for 80 years of service to the Christian Street YMCA in South Philadelphia
- PhD (Honorary), Lincoln University

== See also ==
- Historically black colleges and universities
- Scoutreach
