= Vestryman =

Member of a local church's leading body

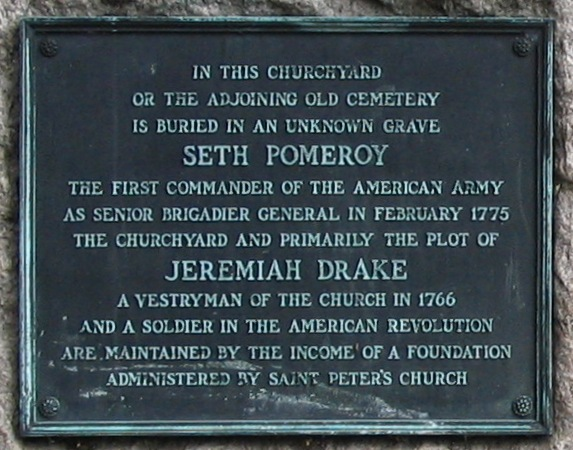
Seth Pomeroy grave plaque at the Hillside Cemetery in Peekskill, New York

A vestryman is a member of his local church's vestry, or leading body. He is not a member of the clergy.

== History ==
In England especially, but also in other parts of the United Kingdom, parish councils have long been a level of local government rather than being solely ecclesiastical in nature. This probably arises from the role of the Church of England as the established church and the Parish (or area served by an individual church) as the most local and immediate level of social involvement.

As these councils often met in the vestry of the local church, either for convenience or because there were no other suitable rooms available, the name became associated with the council and in some places (e.g., Camberwell in London) identified it.

A Vestry may also have had the role of supervising local (Parish) public services, such as the workhouse, administration of poor relief, the keeping of parish records (baptisms, deaths and marriages) and so on. Usually the term vestryman (as used in the UK) would denote a member of the parish council at a certain period in history (and is synonymous with or equivalent to a parish councillor) but the term may, depending on context, also signify an official (or employee) of the Parish Council although strictly, this should be in the form Vestry man.

It is possible that usage in other countries derives from the English tradition and denotes someone involved in practical governance (of a church and its activities, if not a geographical or administrative area) as distinct from a purely spiritual ministry.
