= Chichester, Pennsylvania =

Unincorporated community in Pennsylvania, US

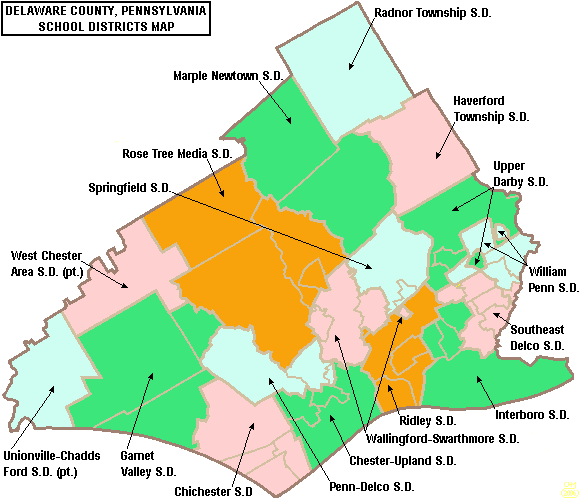
- Location of Chichester School District (southernmost pink area) in Delaware County
- Motto: The Cornerstone of Pennsylvania
- Location of Chichester in Pennsylvania
- Coordinates: 39°50′06″N 75°26′40″W
- Country: United States
- State: Pennsylvania
- County: Delaware

Area
  - Total: 10.8 sq mi (28 km^{2})
  - Land: 10 sq mi (26 km^{2})
  - Water: .8 sq mi (2.1 km^{2})

Population (2016)
  - Total: 30,648
  - Density: 3,100/sq mi (1,200/km^{2})
- Time zone: UTC-5 (EST)
  - Summer (DST): UTC-4 (EDT)
- ZIP Code: 19061
- Area codes: 484 and 610
- Website: www.marcushookboro.com www.trainerborough.org www.upperchichester.org

Chichester (/ˈtʃaɪ.tʃɛs.tər/), formerly New Chichester in reference to the English city, is a region in Delaware County, Pennsylvania, United States. It includes the townships of Upper Chichester and Lower Chichester, and the boroughs of Marcus Hook, and Trainer. Other communities included in the region are Linwood (Lower Chichester Township), Boothwyn (Upper Chichester Township), Ogden (Upper Chichester Township), and Twin Oaks (Upper Chichester Township).

== Geography ==
Boothwyn is located at 39°50′6″N 75°26′40″W (39.835115, -75.444507).

Ogden is located at 39°49′39″N 75°27′09″W (39.82744 -75.452503).

Twin Oaks is located at 39°50′21″N 75°25′20″W (39.839123,-75.422173).

Linwood is located at 39°49′33″N 75°25′22″W (39.825945, -75.422808).

Marcus Hook is located at 39°49′6″N 75°24′56″W (39.818212, -75.415561).

Trainer is located at 39°49′43″N 75°24′13″W (39.828612, -75.403599).

Boothwyn, Reliance, and Ogden fire companies are all located in and serve Upper Chichester Township.

The Lower Chichester Fire Company is located in and serves Linwood, PA.

The Marcus Hook-Trainer Fire Company server both Marcus Hook and Trainer.

The Sun Oil Fire Company is located in The Sun Oil Refinery in Marcus Hook.

=== Adjacent areas ===
- Aston - north
- Chester - northeast
- Logan Township, New Jersey - east
- Claymont, Delaware - south
- Talleyville, Delaware - southwest
- Garnet Valley - west

== Educational system ==
Chichester is the only part of Chichester School District. Children within the area usually attend Boothwyn Elementary School (Grades K-4), Marcus Hook Elementary School (Grades K-4), Hilltop Elementary School (Grades K-4), Linwood Elementary School (Grades K-4), Chichester Middle School (Grades 5-8), and the only high school in the district known as Chichester High School (Grades 9-12). Chichester High School has a math department that consists of eleven teachers. Holy Saviour St. John Fisher School is located within district.
