= Marcus Hook, Pennsylvania =

Borough in Pennsylvania, US

Marcus Hook, Pennsylvania Marreties Hoeck
- Borough
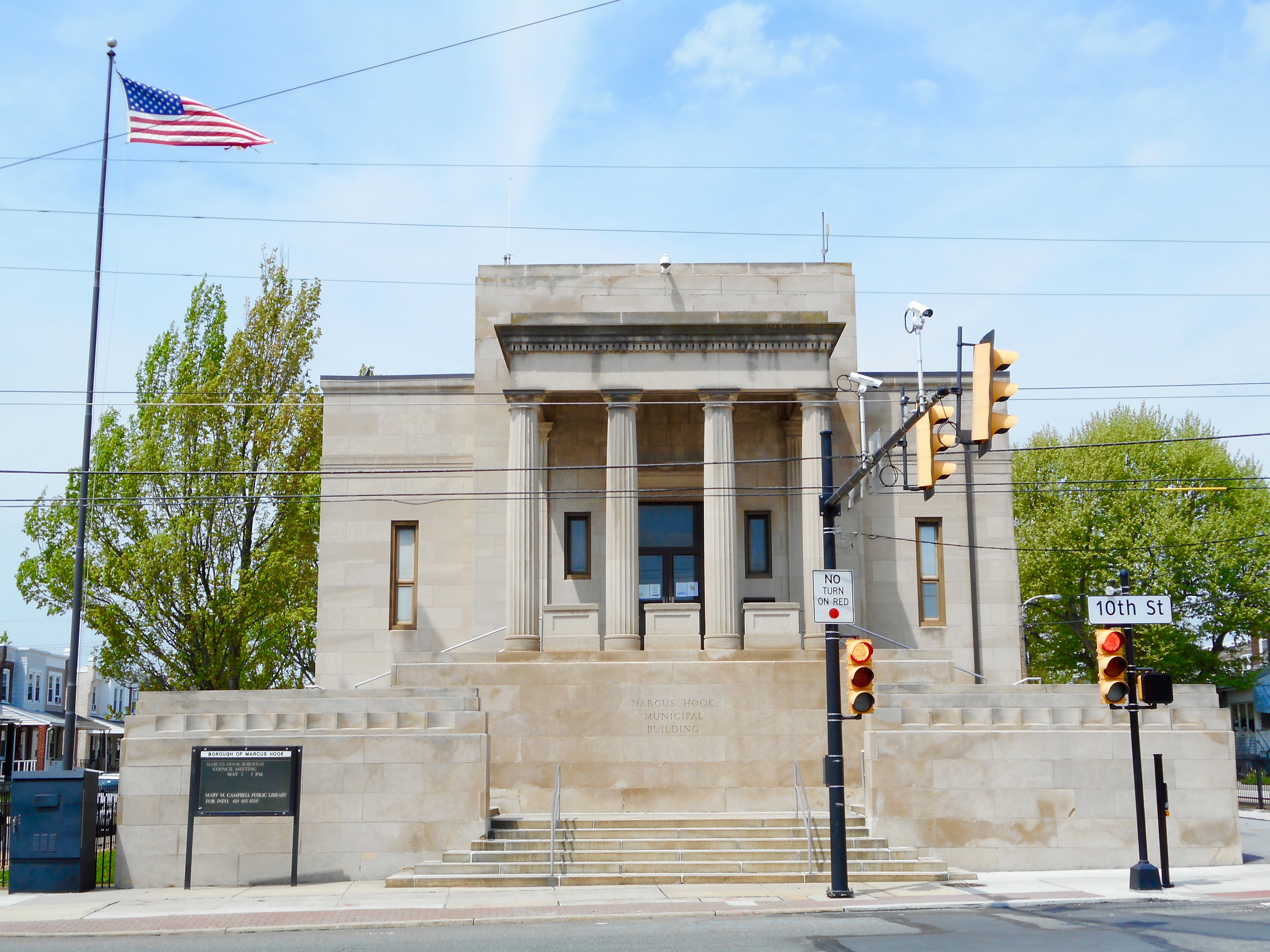
- Marcus Hook Borough Hall

- Flag Logo
- Motto: The Cornerstone of Pennsylvania
- Location of Marcus Hook in Delaware County, Pennsylvania (top) and of Delaware County in Pennsylvania (below)

- Location of Marcus Hook in Pennsylvania Marcus Hook (the United States)
- Coordinates: 39°49′N 75°25′W
- Country: United States
- State: Pennsylvania
- County: Delaware
- Established: 1655

Government
  - Mayor: Gene Taylor

Area
  - Total: 1.63 sq mi (4.21 km^{2})
  - Land: 1.11 sq mi (2.87 km^{2})
  - Water: 0.52 sq mi (1.34 km^{2})
- Elevation: 30 ft (9.1 m)

Population (2020)
  - Total: 2,454
  - Density: 2,214.2/sq mi (854.89/km^{2})
- Time zone: UTC-5 (EST)
  - Summer (DST): UTC-4 (EDT)
- ZIP Code: 19061
- Area codes: 610 and 484
- FIPS code: 42-47344
- Website: www.marcushookboro.org

Marcus Hook is a borough in Delaware County, Pennsylvania, United States. As of the 2020 census, Marcus Hook had a population of 2,454. The current mayor is Gene Taylor. The borough calls itself "The Cornerstone of Pennsylvania". The 2005 film One Last Thing... was set and partially filmed in Marcus Hook.

== History ==
=== Before settlement ===
The earliest inhabitants of Marcus Hook were members of the Lenape Native American tribe and their indigenous ancestors, whose succeeding cultures occupied present-day Marcus Hook and surrounding areas for thousands of years.

=== 17th century ===
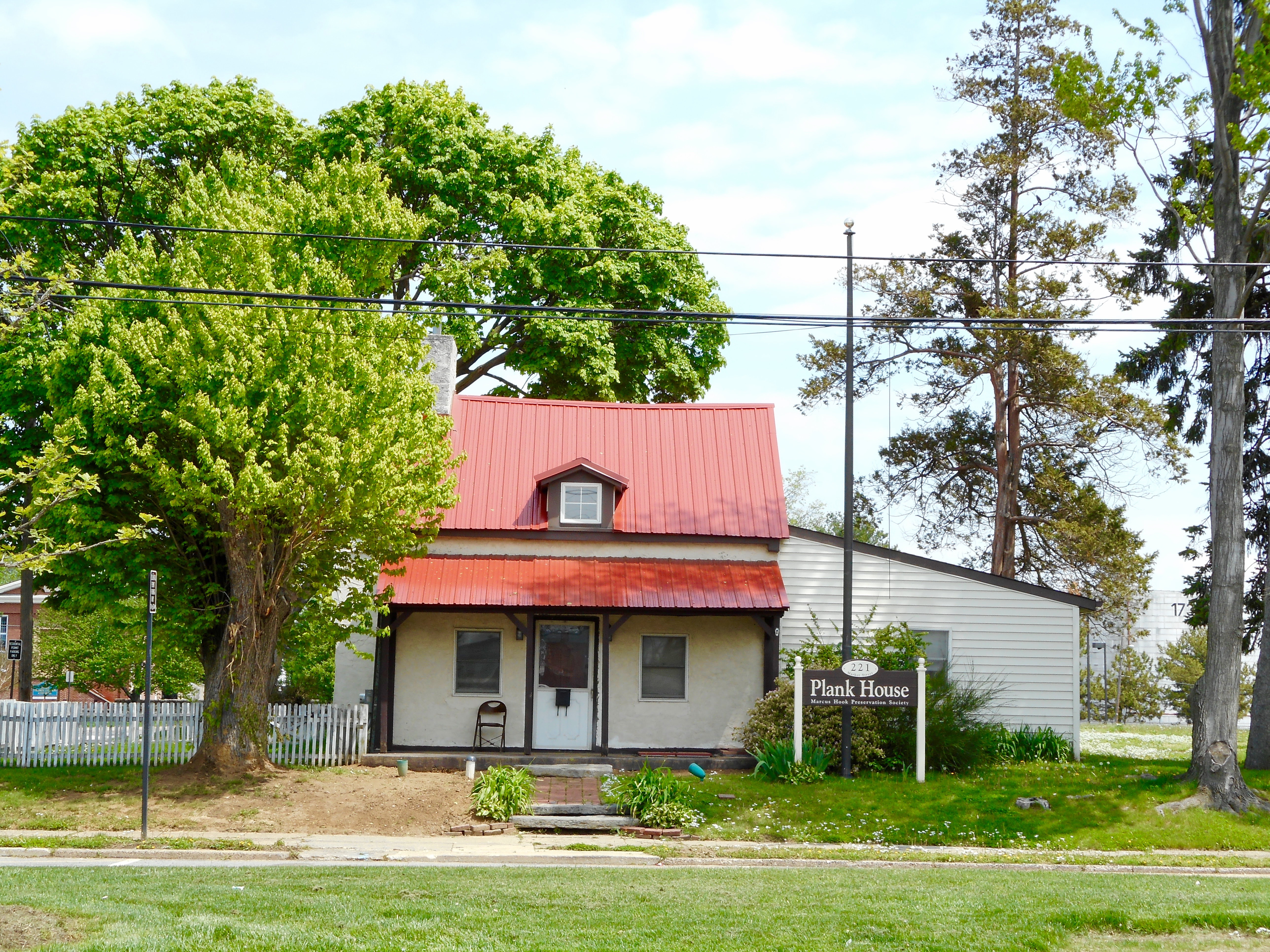
The Plank House in Marcus Hook

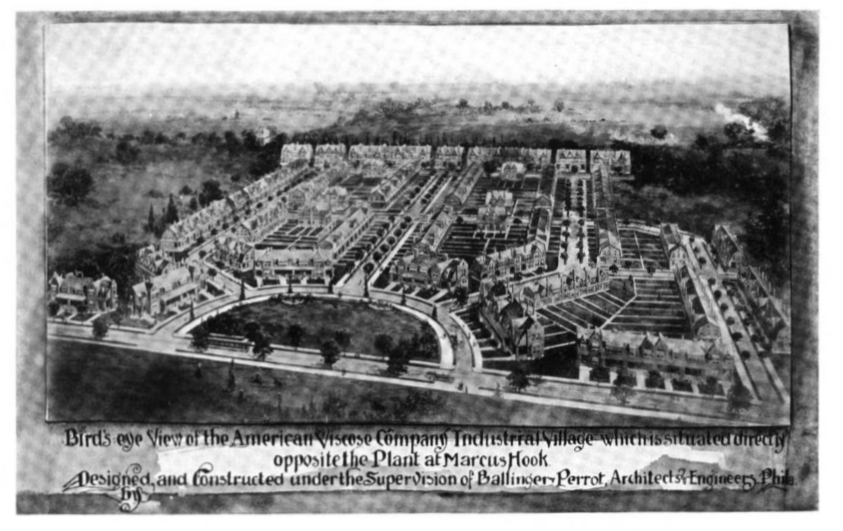
American Viscose Corporation Industrial Village

The Lenape had a major settlement in Marcus Hook; New Sweden colonists established a trading post here in the 1640s. The village, called Chammassungh, or "Finland" by the Swedes, was located on the west side of the Delaware River, between Marcus Hook Creek and Naamans Creek. Dutch colonists renamed the settlement as Marrites Hoeck after they conquered the area in 1655. The name is derived from the word Hook, meaning promontory, or point of land projecting into the water and Marcus, a corruption of the name of the Indian chief, called Maarte by the Dutch, who lived at the Hook.

English colonists gained control of the Dutch colonies and founded St. Martin's Church in 1699; the new church opened for worship in 1702. Walter Martin of Upper Chichester founded this church as an alternative place of worship and burial for Christian non-Quakers.

=== 18th century ===
Marcus Hook became a prosperous community and market town and in 1708 was of equal prominence to nearby Chester, Pennsylvania, with each location having around 100 houses.

In the early 1700s, Marcus Hook was a haven for pirates who plagued the lower Delaware River. The market at Marcus Hook provided the pirates a place to sell plundered goods and resupply away from the authorities and customs officials in Philadelphia. Early maps of Marcus Hook show the current Second Street was originally named "Discord Lane", since it was the location of the pirates' revelry when they were in town.

Marcus Hook Plank House reportedly was once the home of a Swedish mistress of the pirate Blackbeard, named Margaret.

By the mid-18th century, Marcus Hook became a major regional center for the building of wooden sailing ships and remained so until the late 19th century. By that time, larger tonnage ships became more popular than the sloops and schooners built in Marcus Hook.

During the American Revolutionary War, two tiers of underwater chevaux-de-frise obstacles were placed across the Delaware River at Marcus Hook to provide a first line of defense of Philadelphia against British naval forces. Marcus Hook also served as a training center for the Pennsylvania militia. The Continental Army was stationed at Marcus Hook during the fall of 1777. As the town was bombarded by British warships, very few pre-Revolutionary houses remain in Marcus Hook.

=== 19th century ===
Marcus Hook served as a defensive post along the Delaware River during the War of 1812, with over 5,000 United States troops placed there.

The borough was officially incorporated on March 7, 1892. The convergence of rail, roads, a deep-water port, and the nation's growing thirst for petroleum gave rise to the refineries that became the borough's dominant industry.

=== 20th century ===
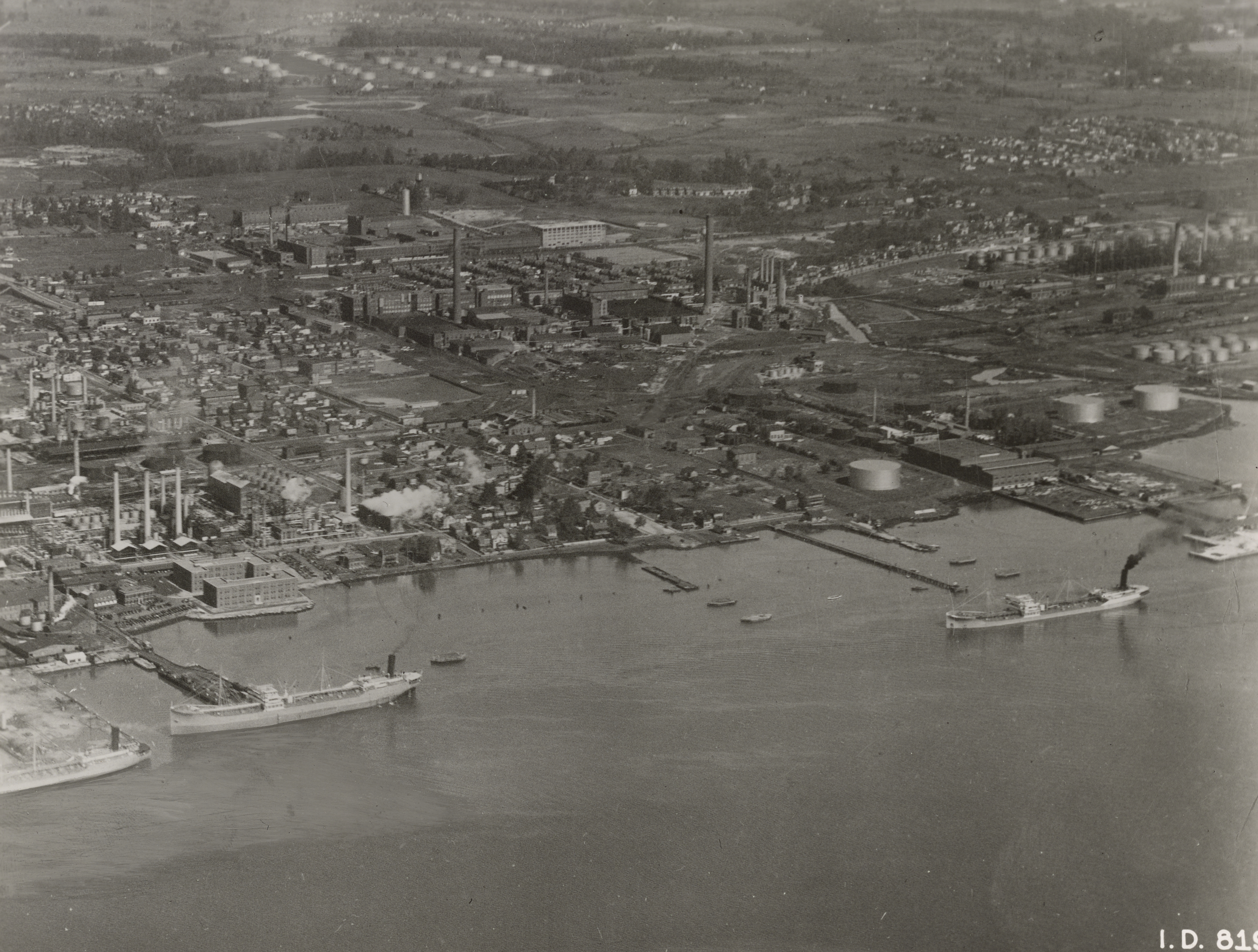
Post card of Marcus Hook in 1941

Sun Oil Company opened the Marcus Hook refinery in 1901 to refine crude oil brought by ship from Texas. It was the first of seven major refineries that made up the largest fuel-manufacturing center in the Northeast. The refinery was closed in 2011 due to deteriorating market conditions. The refinery was reopened as Marcus Hook Industrial Complex operated by Energy Transfer Partners. Processing Marcellus Shale gas transferred via the Mariner East and Mariner XL Pipelines.

In 1910, the American Viscose Corporation opened a plant in Marcus Hook for the production of rayon and other synthetic fibers. The company also built an "Industrial Village" to house some of its workers.

On February 4, 1932, the MS Bidwell, a motor tanker belonging to Sun Oil, exploded and burned at the Sinclair Dock while tanks were being cleaned of residual crude oil in preparation for loading of gasoline. The first explosion occurred at 12:20 am and was followed by three more explosions within 25 minutes, resulting in 17 or 18 dead, including the entire crew and captain, and four were injured. The disaster induced Sun Oil to develop cargo tank inerting and install it on all their ships beginning the following year, in 1933.

== Geography ==
Marcus Hook is located along the southern border of Delaware County, Pennsylvania, at 39°49′N 75°25′W (39.8182, -75.4155). It is bordered to the northwest by Lower Chichester Township, including the community of Linwood, to the northeast by the borough of Trainer, to the southeast across the Delaware River by Gloucester County, New Jersey, and to the southwest by New Castle County, Delaware. The southern border of Marcus Hook is part of the Twelve-Mile Circle border between Pennsylvania and Delaware.

According to the U.S. Census Bureau, Marcus Hook has a total area of 1.6 square miles (4.2 km^{2}), of which 0.50 sq mi (1.3 km^{2}), or 31.63%, is covered by water. The lowest point in the state of Pennsylvania is located on the Delaware River in Marcus Hook, where it flows out of Pennsylvania and into Delaware. The borough has a humid subtropical climate (Cfa) and average monthly temperatures range from 33.1 °F in January to 77.9 °F in July. The hardiness zone is 7b.

== Education ==
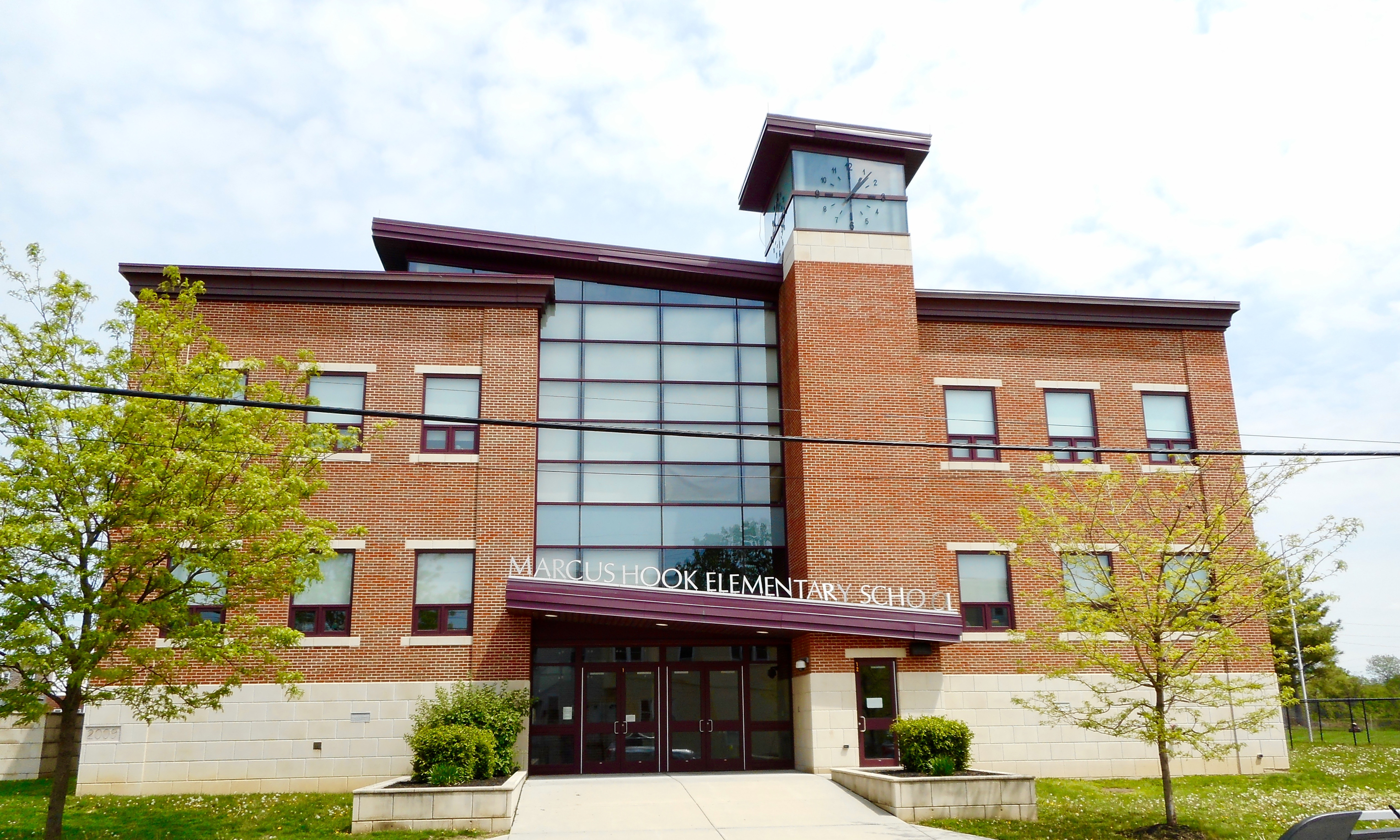
Marcus Hook Elementary School

Marcus Hook is a part of Chichester School District, which includes Marcus Hook Elementary School for kindergarten (K) through grade 4, Chichester Middle School for grades 5–8, and Chichester High School for grades 9–12. Each of the three schools is located in Marcus Hook.

The area Catholic K–grade 8 school is Holy Family Regional Catholic School in Aston. Marcus Hook previously had its own Catholic grade school, Immaculate Conception School. It closed in 1974, with students moved to Holy Savior School. That school merged into Holy Savior-St. John Fisher School in Linwood, which in turn merged into Holy Family in 2012.

== Demographics ==
Historical population
Census	Pop.	Note	%±
1900	1,209		—
1910	1,573		30.1%
1920	5,324		238.5%
1930	4,867		−8.6%
1940	4,123		−15.3%
1950	3,843		−6.8%
1960	3,299		−14.2%
1970	3,041		−7.8%
1980	2,638		−13.3%
1990	2,546		−3.5%
2000	2,314		−9.1%
2010	2,397		3.6%
2020	2,454		2.4%

As of the 2010 census, the racial makeup of the borough was 82.3% White, 13.6% African American, 0.1% Native American, 0.4% Asian, 0.3% from other races, and 3.6% from two or more races. Hispanics or Latinos of any race were 3.0% of the population.

As of the 2000 census, 2,314 people, 919 households, and 565 families were residing in the borough. The population density was 2,055.7 inhabitants per square mile (793.7/km^{2}). The 1,025 housing units had an average density of 910.6 per square mile (351.6/km^{2}). The racial makeup of the borough was 91.44% White, 5.32% African American, 0.09% Native American, 0.61% Asian, 0.69% from other races, and 1.86% from two or more races. Hispanics or Latinos of any race were 1.77% of the population.

Of the 919 households, 32.1% had children under 18 living with them, 33.9% were married couples living together, 19.8% had a female householder with no husband present, and 38.5% were not families. About 31.8% of all households were made up of individuals, and 12.3% had someone living alone who was 65 years of age or older. The average household size was 2.52 and the average family size was 3.18.

In the borough, the age distribution was 28.1% under 18, 8.9% from 18 to 24, 31.5% from 25 to 44, 20.4% from 45 to 64, and 11.1% who were 65 or older. The median age was 34 years. For every 100 females, there were 94.1 males. For every 100 females 18 and over, there were 90.4 males.

The median income in the borough for a household was $28,219 and for a family was $36,083. Males had a median income of $31,620 versus $24,569 for females. The per capita income for the borough was $13,738. About 13.3% of families and 21.7% of the population were below the poverty line, including 22.5% of those under 18 and 16.5% of those 65 or over.

== Transportation ==
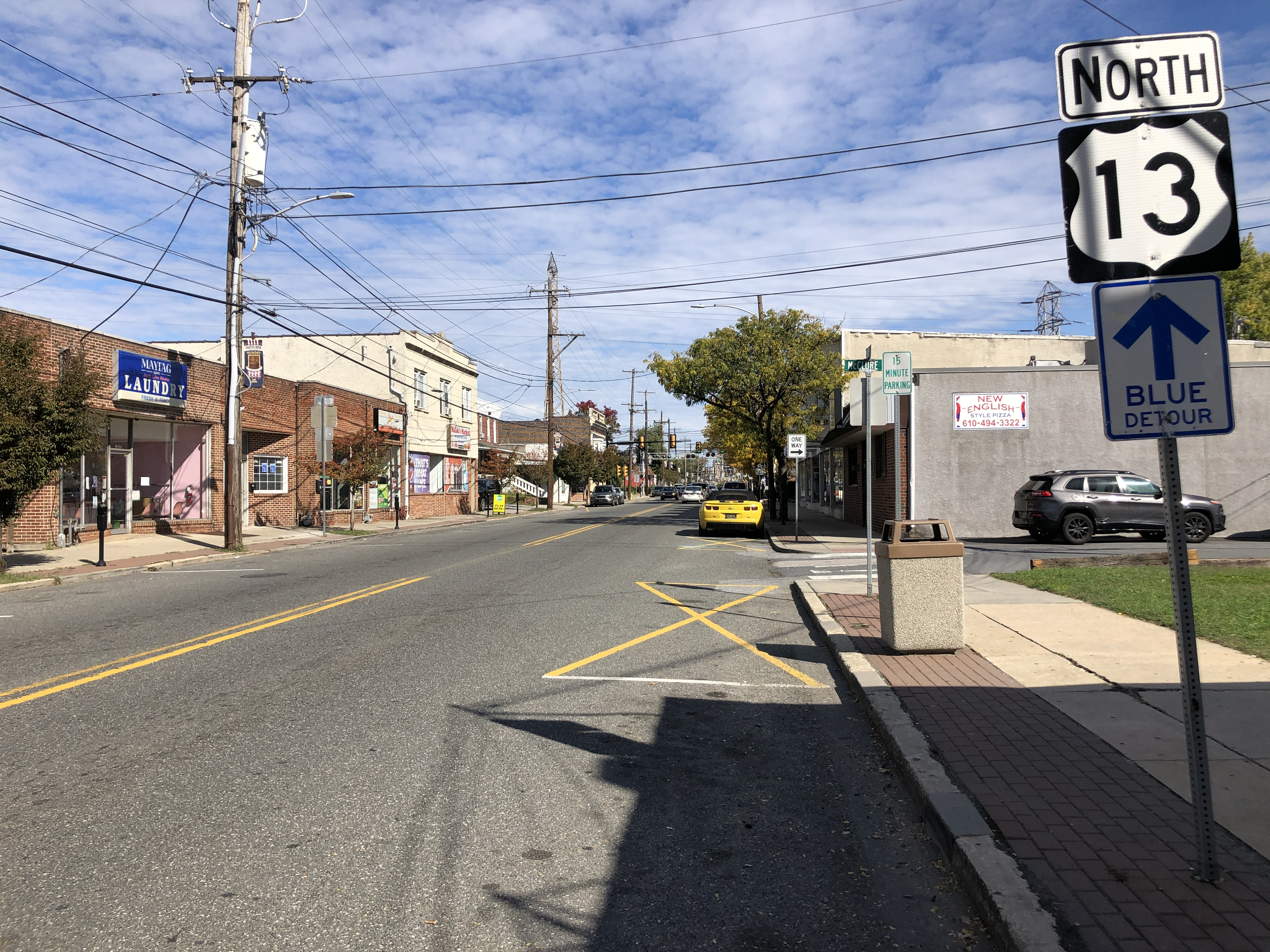
US 13 North in Marcus Hook

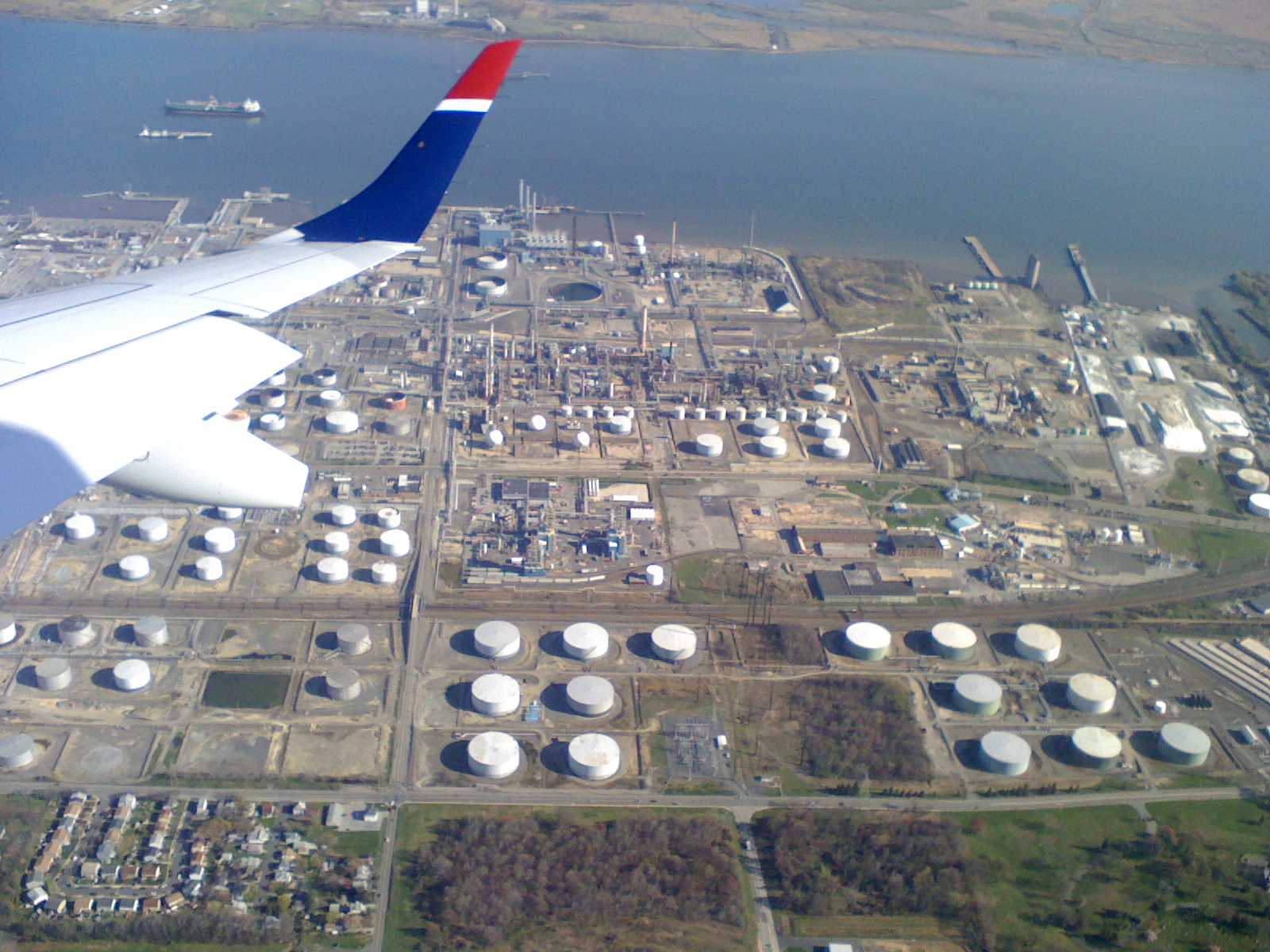
Aerial view of the Marcus Hook riverfront

As of 2020, 7.25 miles (11.67 km) of public roads were in Marcus Hook, of which 1.90 miles (3.06 km) were maintained by the Pennsylvania Department of Transportation and 5.35 miles (8.61 km) were maintained by the borough.

U.S. Route 13 (10th Street) is the main road through the borough, leading northeast 4 miles (6 km) to Chester, and southwest 9 miles (14 km) to Wilmington, Delaware. Pennsylvania Route 452 (Market Street) intersects US 13 in the center of the borough and leads north 1 mile (1.6 km) to Interstate 95 Exit 2 and 7 miles (11 km) to U.S. Route 1 west of Media. Marcus Hook station is a SEPTA train station on the Wilmington/Newark Line providing service to Center City Philadelphia and Wilmington and Newark, Delaware. SEPTA Route 119 bus also services Marcus Hook along its route between Chester Transit Center and Cheyney University.

== Notable people ==
- Ron Bennington, SiriusXM radio personality
- William Bucknell, businessman and benefactor of Bucknell University for whom the university is named
- Elisha Cullen Dick, attending physician of George Washington at time of his death
- Ralph Garzia, Pennsylvania state representative
- John Grubb, member of the Pennsylvania Provincial Assembly and original settler of Brandywine Hundred
- Robert E. Haebel, U.S. Marine Corps major general
- Billy "White Shoes" Johnson, former professional football player
- Albert Dutton MacDade, Pennsylvania state senator and judge in the Delaware County Court of Common Pleas
- Mickey Vernon, professional baseball player
- Curt Weldon, former U.S. representative and Marcus Hook mayor

== Religion ==
The Roman Catholic Archdiocese of Philadelphia operates Catholic churches. Immaculate Conception of Lourdes Church in Marcus Hook opened in January 1917. In 2013, Immaculate Conception merged with in St. John Fisher Church in Upper Chichester Township, with the Immaculate Conception parish closed.

== References in popular culture ==
The 2005 American comedy-drama film One Last Thing..., about a 16-year-old terminally ill boy hoping his final wish is granted, takes place in Marcus Hook.
