= Billy "White Shoes" Johnson =

American football player (born 1952)

Billy Johnson
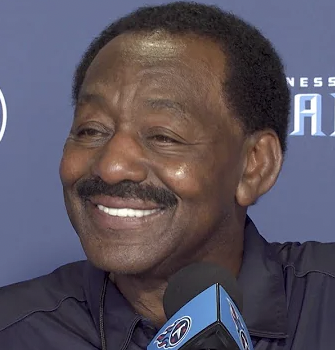
- Johnson in 2021

No. 84, 81, 88
- Positions: Wide receiver, return specialist

Personal information
- Born: January 27, 1952 (age 74); Marcus Hook, Pennsylvania, U.S.
- Listed height: 5 ft 9 in (1.75 m)
- Listed weight: 170 lb (77 kg)

Career information
- High school: Chichester (Boothwyn, Pennsylvania)
- College: Widener (1971–1973)
- NFL draft: 1974: 15th round, 365th overall pick

Career history
- Houston Oilers (1974–1980); Montreal Alouettes (1981); Atlanta Falcons (1982–1987); Washington Redskins (1988)

Awards and highlights
- NFL Comeback Player of the Year (1983); 3× First-team All-Pro (1975, 1977, 1983); 3× Pro Bowl (1975, 1977, 1983); NFL 1970s All-Decade Team; NFL 1980s All-Decade Team; NFL 75th Anniversary All-Time Team; NFL 100th Anniversary All-Time Team; Titans/Oilers Ring of Honor; 2× First-team Little All-American (1972, 1973)

Career NFL statistics
- Punt return yards: 3,317
- Kickoff return yards: 2,941
- Return touchdowns: 8
- Receptions: 337
- Receiving yards: 4,211
- Receiving touchdowns: 25
- Stats at Pro Football Reference
- College Football Hall of Fame

William Arthur Johnson (born January 27, 1952), better known as Billy "White Shoes" Johnson, is an American former professional football player who was a wide receiver and return specialist in the National Football League (NFL) from 1974 through 1988. A 75th and 100th Anniversary All-Time NFL Team selection, Johnson was one of the first players to display elaborate celebrations in the end zone.

== Early life ==
Johnson earned the nickname "White Shoes" in high school in the Chichester School District in Boothwyn, Pennsylvania, where he dyed his shoes as part of a dare. Johnson attended Division III school Widener College in Pennsylvania, where he was a member of Alpha Sigma Phi fraternity. As a 5'9", 170-pound sophomore, Johnson was named to the 1972 Associated Press College Division All-American team. Johnson was drafted by the Houston Oilers, in the 15th round of the 1974 NFL draft.

== Professional career ==
=== Houston Oilers ===
Johnson joined the Houston Oilers as a kickoff returner, with his speed and quickness becoming an occasional part of the offense. As a rookie, he began celebrating touchdowns with a dance known as the "Funky Chicken", a dance based on a song from soul singer Rufus Thomas. It was one of the first touchdown celebrations in league history.

As a kick returner, Johnson returned five punts for touchdowns, along with two kickoffs, in his first four years with the Oilers, and added 12 more touchdowns on offense. He was selected to the Pro Bowl as a kick returner in 1975, and was named MVP of the game, during which he returned a punt 90 yards for a touchdown. He made another Pro Bowl appearance in 1977. In 1979, he suffered a knee injury that caused him to miss most of the next two seasons and lingered with him for the rest of his career. When he returned in 1980, he was no longer the kick returner, serving only as a backup wide receiver.

=== CFL and the Atlanta Falcons ===
Johnson played the 1981 season in the Canadian Football League with the Montreal Alouettes. He caught 65 passes for 1,060 yards and five touchdowns, and returned 59 punts for 597 yards. He returned to the NFL with the Atlanta Falcons in 1982. In 1983, he doubled as a full-time kick returner, where he scored his sixth career touchdown on a punt return, and starting wide receiver, leading the team in receptions. Johnson earned his third Pro Bowl berth that season. Most notably, he caught a Hail Mary pass to defeat the San Francisco 49ers. He missed most of 1984 due to injury, and was benched as a return man in 1985. Johnson was forced to curtail his end-zone dances after the NFL instituted a rule against excessive and premeditated celebration. He led the Falcons in receptions and receiving yards in 1985. Johnson was injured in 1986 and retired after the 1987 season, although he played one game for the Washington Redskins in 1988.

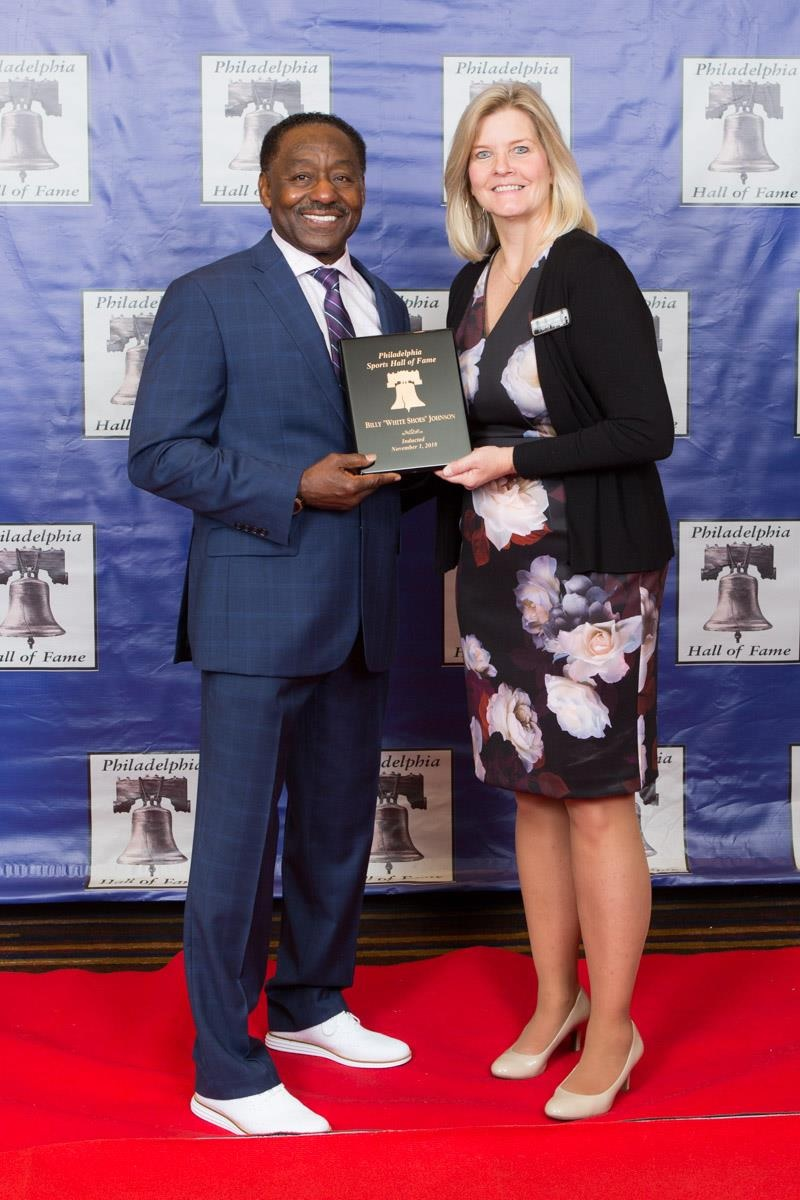
Johnson (left) receiving his induction into the Philadelphia Sports Hall of Fame

== Coaching career ==
Johnson is an assistant varsity football coach at Duluth High School in Duluth, Georgia.

== Professional softball career ==
Johnson appeared in 25 games for the Philadelphia Athletics of the American Professional Slo-Pitch Softball League (APSPL) in 1978, one of several men's professional softball leagues, batting .349 with four home-runs.

== Honors ==
In 1994, Johnson was selected as the punt returner on the NFL 75th Anniversary All-Time Team. His was inducted into the College Football Hall of Fame in 1996 and the Philadelphia Sports Hall of Fame in 2018.

Johnson is the only man selected to the National Football League 75th Anniversary All-Time Team who is not in the Pro Football Hall of Fame.

Johnson is one of 29 individuals to be selected to multiple All-Decade teams. On December 17, 2023, Johnson was inducted into the Tennessee Titans Ring of Honor.

== Masters Track and Field ==
Johnson was a star sprinter, and competed in Masters Track and Field after his football career.
