= Linwood, Pennsylvania =

Unincorporated community in Pennsylvania, US

- Census-designated place
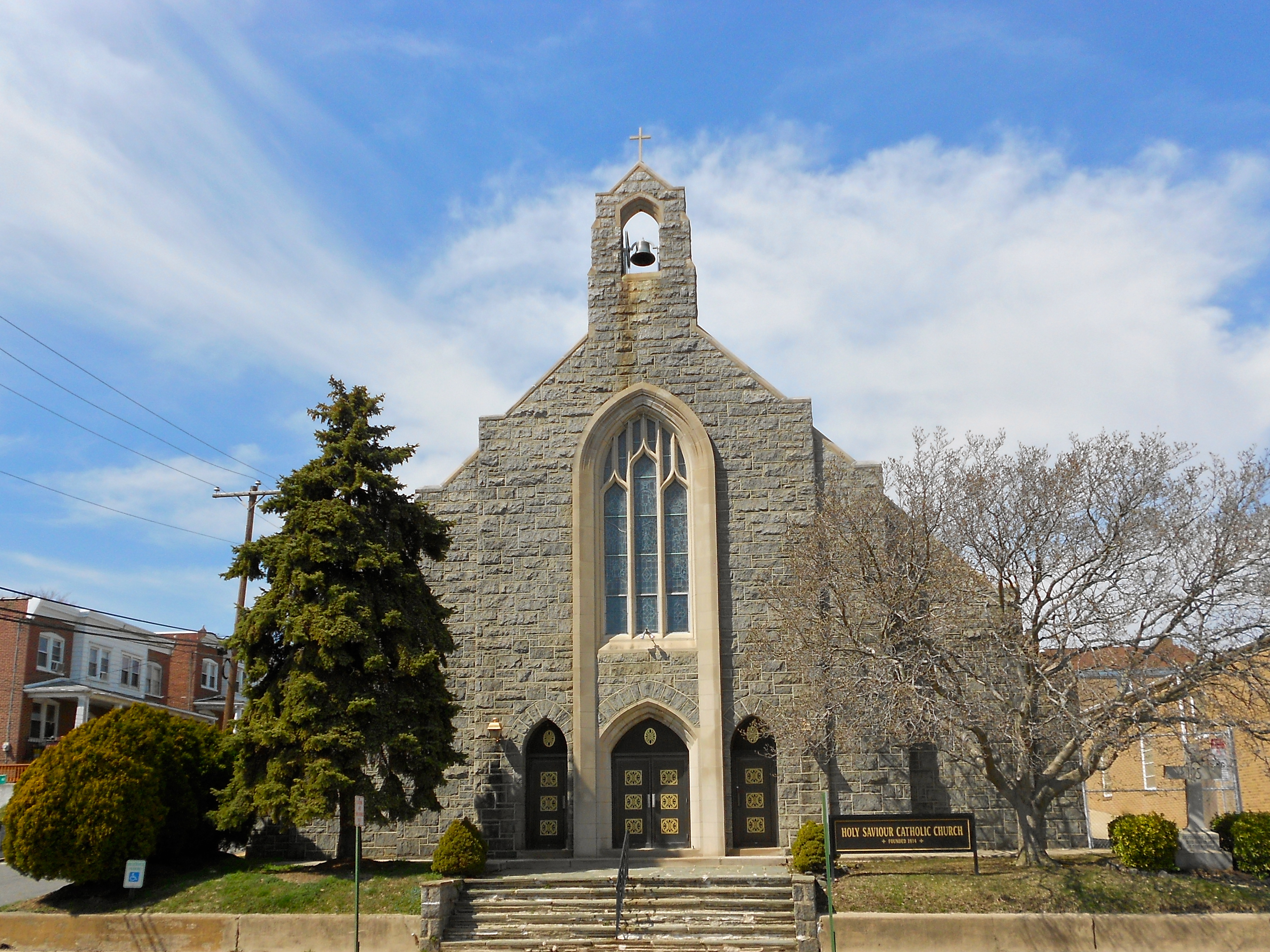
- Holy Saviour Catholic Church

- Location in Delaware County and the U.S. state of Pennsylvania
- Coordinates: 39°49′33″N 75°25′22″W
- Country: United States
- State: Pennsylvania
- County: Delaware
- Township: Lower Chichester

Area
  - Total: 0.65 sq mi (1.68 km^{2})
  - Land: 0.65 sq mi (1.68 km^{2})
  - Water: 0 sq mi (0.00 km^{2})
- Elevation: 102 ft (31 m)

Population (2020)
  - Total: 3,949
  - Density: 6,078.9/sq mi (2,347.07/km^{2})
- Time zone: UTC-5 (EST)
  - Summer (DST): UTC-4 (EDT)
- ZIP code: 19061
- Area codes: 610 and 484
- FIPS code: 42-43720
- GNIS feature ID: 1179441

Linwood is a census-designated place (CDP) in Delaware County, Pennsylvania, United States. The population was 3,281 at the 2010 census.

== Geography ==
Linwood is located in southern Delaware County at 39°49′33″N 75°25′22″W (39.825945, -75.422808). It occupies the eastern half of Lower Chichester and is home to more than 90% of the township's population. It is bordered to the south by the borough of Marcus Hook and to the east by the borough of Trainer. The northern border is with Upper Chichester Township.

According to the United States Census Bureau, the Linwood CDP has a total area of 0.50 square miles (1.3 km^{2}), all land.

== Education ==
Linwood is a part of Chichester School District. Children within the area usually attend Linwood Elementary School (Grades K-4), Chichester Middle School (Grades 5–8), or Chichester High School (Grades 9–12).

Holy Family Regional Catholic School in Aston is the area Catholic school. It formed in 2012 from a merger of Holy Savior-St. John Fisher Elementary School in Linwood and St. Joseph Catholic School in Aston.

Holy Saviour-St. John Fisher School in Linwood opened in September 1917. Its service area included Lower Chichester Township, Marcus Hook, and Upper Chichester Township. Its first facility had four classrooms. It moved in 1952. Enrollment later exceeded 900 and the later building had an addition, with a total of 16 classrooms. It was renamed to Holy Saviour-St. John Fisher School several years after the establishment of St. John Fisher Church in Boothwyn, Upper Chichester Township in 1971. It began taking students of Immaculate Conception Parish of Marcus Hook in 1974 and students in Trainer after 1993, the latter when Resurrection School in Chester closed. In 1998 one classroom and a computer lab were added to the campus. It merged into Holy Family Regional Catholic School in 2012. At the end of its life it served three parishes: Holy Saviour, St. John Fisher, and Immaculate Conception.

== Demographics ==
Historical population
Census	Pop.	Note	%±
2020	3,949		—
U.S. Decennial Census

=== 2020 census ===
As of the 2020 census, the median age was 35.6 years. 26.7% of residents were under the age of 18 and 11.6% of residents were 65 years of age or older. For every 100 females there were 89.0 males, and for every 100 females age 18 and over there were 84.0 males age 18 and over.

100.0% of residents lived in urban areas, while 0.0% lived in rural areas.

There were 1,443 households in Linwood, of which 38.9% had children under the age of 18 living in them. Of all households, 32.6% were married-couple households, 21.4% were households with a male householder and no spouse or partner present, and 36.5% were households with a female householder and no spouse or partner present. About 25.7% of all households were made up of individuals and 10.3% had someone living alone who was 65 years of age or older.

There were 1,577 housing units, of which 8.5% were vacant. The homeowner vacancy rate was 2.3% and the rental vacancy rate was 5.1%.

Racial composition as of the 2020 census
Race	Number	Percent
White	2,752	69.7%
Black or African American	819	20.7%
American Indian and Alaska Native	20	0.5%
Asian	42	1.1%
Native Hawaiian and Other Pacific Islander	0	0.0%
Some other race	65	1.6%
Two or more races	251	6.4%
Hispanic or Latino (of any race)	196	5.0%

=== 2000 census ===
As of the census of 2000, there were 3,374 people, 1,204 households, and 859 families living in the CDP. The population density was 6,386.5 inhabitants per square mile (2,465.8/km^{2}). There were 1,275 housing units at an average density of 2,413.4 per square mile (931.8/km^{2}). The racial makeup of the CDP was 96.50% White, 1.81% African American, 0.15% Native American, 0.41% Asian, 0.18% from other races, and 0.95% from two or more races. Hispanic or Latino of any race were 1.33% of the population.

There were 1,204 households, out of which 36.5% had children under the age of 18 living with them, 47.8% were married couples living together, 17.6% had a female householder with no husband present, and 28.6% were non-families. 23.7% of all households were made up of individuals, and 8.1% had someone living alone who was 65 years of age or older. The average household size was 2.80 and the average family size was 3.32.

In the CDP, the population was spread out, with 29.1% under the age of 18, 8.6% from 18 to 24, 31.7% from 25 to 44, 20.0% from 45 to 64, and 10.6% who were 65 years of age or older. The median age was 34 years. For every 100 females, there were 95.1 males. For every 100 females age 18 and over, there were 90.1 males.

The median income for a household in the CDP was $39,103, and the median income for a family was $43,298. Males had a median income of $35,519 versus $23,267 for females. The per capita income for the CDP was $17,037. About 7.2% of families and 10.3% of the population were below the poverty line, including 13.1% of those under age 18 and 3.9% of those age 65 or over.

== Religion ==
The Roman Catholic Archdiocese of Philadelphia operates area Catholic churches. St. John Fisher Church in Upper Chichester Township is the nearby Catholic church. Holy Saviour Church in Linwood opened in January 1914. Holy Savior Church merged with St. John Fisher Church on July 1, 2013. In 2015, worship services at Holy Savior ceased; the archdiocese stated that the church needed $600,000 in repairs.
