= Lower Chichester Township, Pennsylvania =

Township in Pennsylvania, US

Lower Chichester Township Linwood, Pennsylvania
- Township
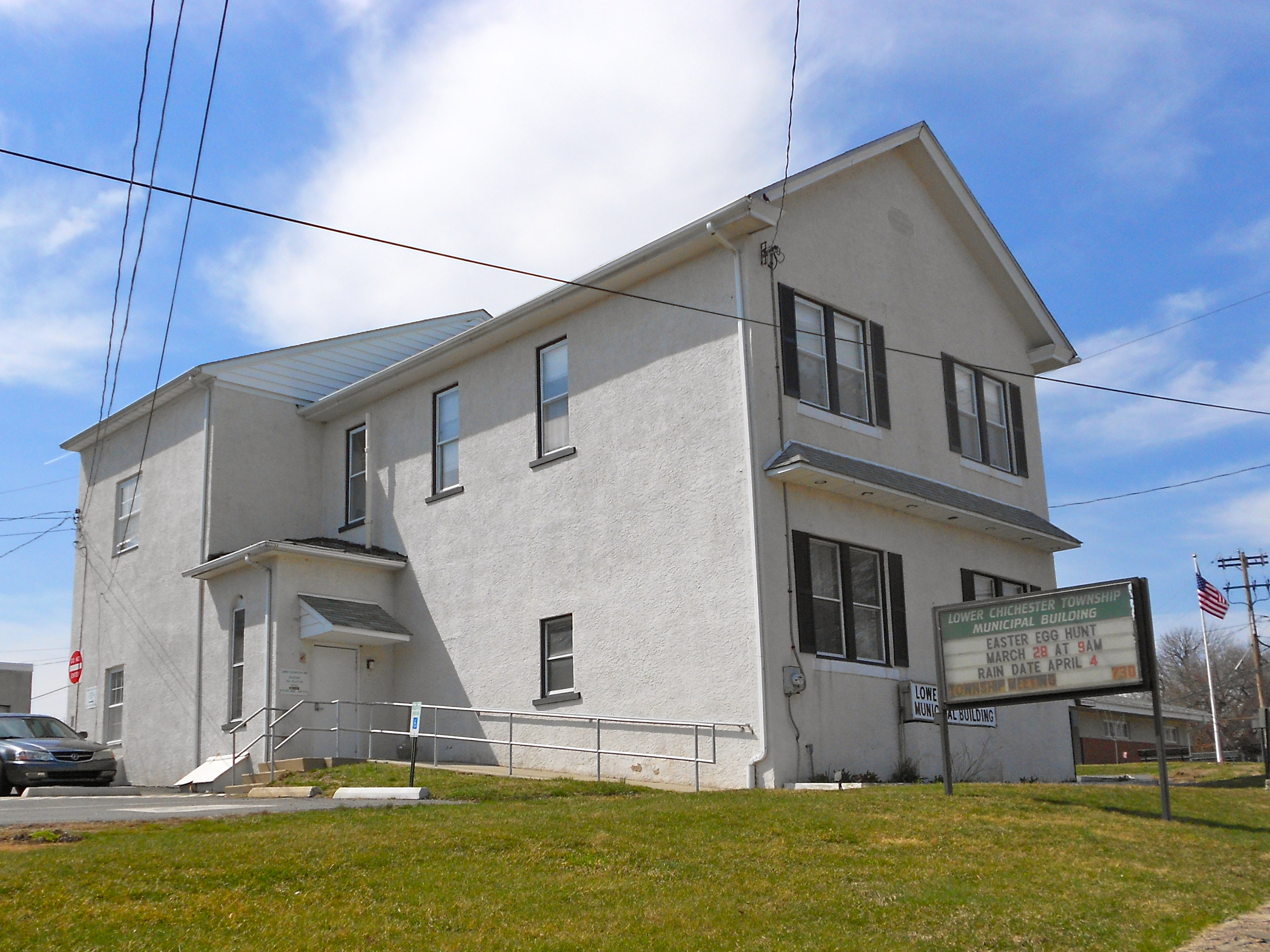
- Town hall

- Location in Delaware County and the state of Pennsylvania.

- Location of Pennsylvania in the United States
- Coordinates: 39°49′36″N 75°25′19″W
- Country: United States
- State: Pennsylvania
- County: Delaware

Area
  - Total: 1.07 sq mi (2.78 km^{2})
  - Land: 1.07 sq mi (2.78 km^{2})
  - Water: 0 sq mi (0.00 km^{2})
- Elevation: 98 ft (30 m)

Population (2010)
  - Total: 3,469
  - Estimate (2016): 3,468
  - Density: 3,233.4/sq mi (1,248.41/km^{2})
- Time zone: UTC-5 (EST)
  - Summer (DST): UTC-4 (EDT)
- ZIP code: 19061
- Area code: 610
- FIPS code: 42-045-44888
- FIPS code: 42-045-44888
- GNIS feature ID: 1216384
- Website: lowerchitwp.com

Lower Chichester Township is a township in Delaware County, Pennsylvania, United States. The population was 3,469 at the 2010 census. It contains the census designated place of Linwood.

== History ==
The first mention of Chichester township is on June 27, 1683, when William Hewes was appointed constable of "Chichester liberty".

On March 1, 1919, part of Lower Chichester Township was incorporated as the borough of Trainer.

== Geography ==
The township is in southern Delaware County and is bordered by Upper Chichester Township to the north, the borough of Trainer to the east, the borough of Marcus Hook to the southeast, and New Castle County, Delaware, to the southwest. The southwest border is part of the 12-mile circle border between Delaware and Pennsylvania. Linwood, a census-designated place, occupies the eastern half of the township and has nearly all of the township's population.

According to the United States Census Bureau, Lower Chichester Township has a total area of 1.07 square miles (2.78 km^{2}), all land.

== Educational system ==
Linwood is a part of Chichester School District. Children within the township usually attend Linwood Elementary School (Grades K-4), Chichester Middle School (Grades 5–8), or Chichester High School (Grades 9–12).

Holy Family Regional Catholic School in Aston, of the Roman Catholic Archdiocese of Philadelphia, is the area Catholic school. It formed in 2012 from a merger of Holy Savior-St. John Fisher Elementary School in Linwood and St. Joseph Catholic School in Aston. Holy Savior School opened in 1917, and changed its name after St. John Fisher Church was established in Boothwyn in 1971 as the school at that time became the parish school of St. John Fisher.

== Demographics ==
Historical population
Census	Pop.	Note	%±
1930	3,473		—
1940	3,108		−10.5%
1950	2,938		−5.5%
1960	4,460		51.8%
1970	4,009		−10.1%
1980	3,784		−5.6%
1990	3,660		−3.3%
2000	3,591		−1.9%
2010	3,469		−3.4%
2020	3,425		−1.3%

As of Census 2010, the racial makeup of the township was 87.6% White, 7.9% African American, 0.1% Native American, 0.6% Asian, 0.5% from other races, and 3.3% from two or more races. Hispanic or Latino of any race were 3.9% of the population .

As of the census of 2000, there were 3,591 people, 1,278 households, and 916 families residing in the township. The population density was 3,224.5 inhabitants per square mile (1,245.0/km^{2}). There were 1,356 housing units at an average density of 1,217.6 per square mile (470.1/km^{2}). The racial makeup of the township was 96.35% White, 2.03% African American, 0.14% Native American, 0.39% Asian, 0.17% from other races, and 0.92% from two or more races. Hispanic or Latino of any race were 1.36% of the population.

There were 1,278 households, out of which 36.3% had children under the age of 18 living with them, 47.7% were married couples living together, 17.9% had a female householder with no husband present, and 28.3% were non-families. 23.4% of all households were made up of individuals, and 7.9% had someone living alone who was 65 years of age or older. The average household size was 2.80 and the average family size was 3.32.

In the township the population was spread out, with 29.2% under the age of 18, 8.7% from 18 to 24, 31.3% from 25 to 44, 20.3% from 45 to 64, and 10.6% who were 65 years of age or older. The median age was 34 years. For every 100 females, there were 95.3 males. For every 100 females age 18 and over, there were 89.9 males.

The median income for a household in the township was $38,846, and the median income for a family was $43,066. Males had a median income of $35,375 versus $22,955 for females. The per capita income for the township was $16,881. About 7.3% of families and 10.2% of the population were below the poverty line, including 12.5% of those under age 18 and 3.7% of those age 65 or over.

== Religion ==
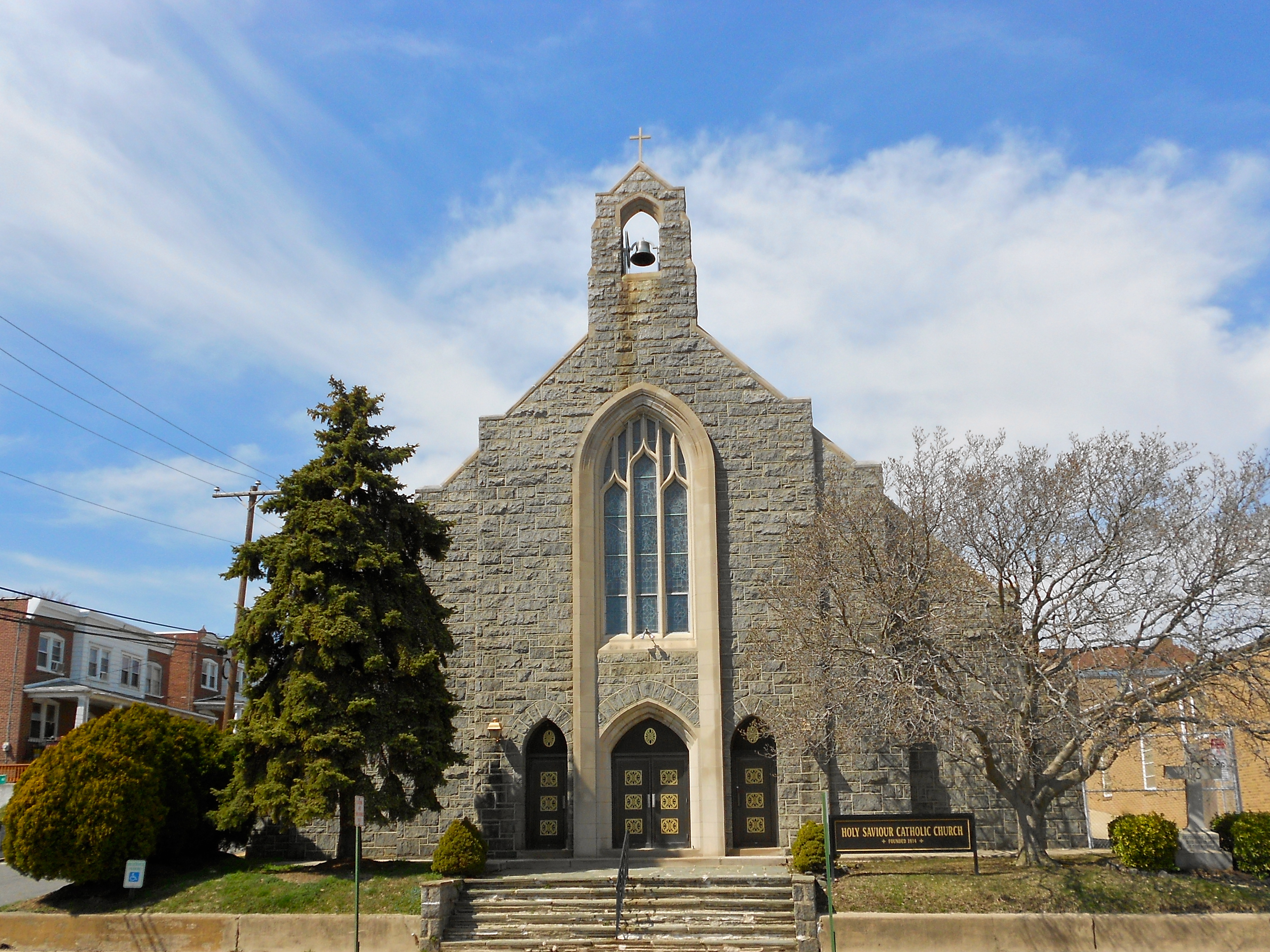
Holy Saviour Catholic Church

The Roman Catholic Archdiocese of Philadelphia operates Catholic churches. Holy Saviour Church in Linwood opened in January 1914. Holy Saviour Church the congregation merged with St. John Fisher Church in Upper Chichester Township, on July 1, 2013, and worship services at Holy Savior ended in 2015; the archdiocese stated that the church needed $600,000 in repairs.

== Transportation ==
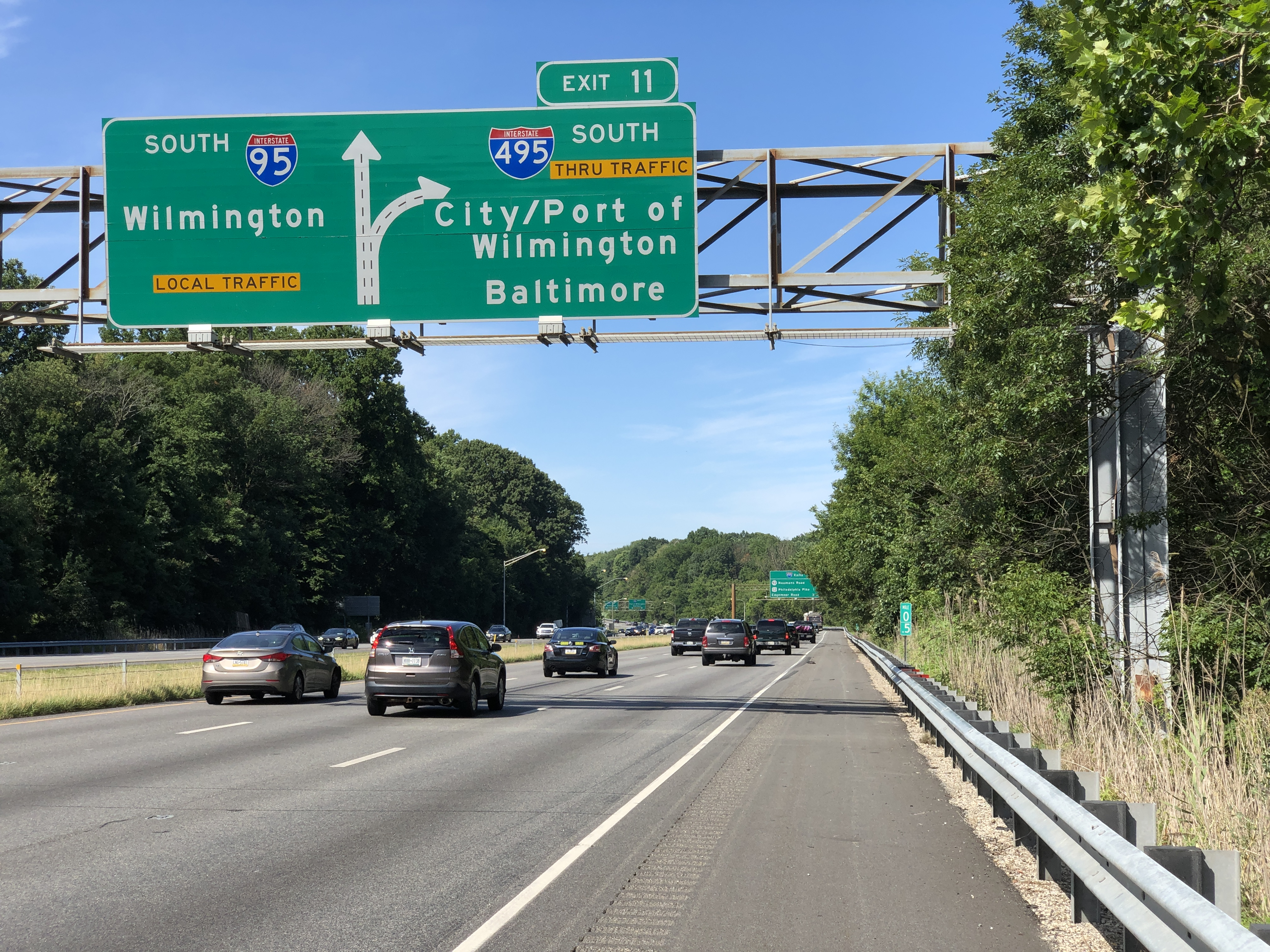
I-95 southbound in Lower Chichester Township

As of 2018, there were 9.47 miles (15.24 km) of public roads in Lower Chichester Township, of which 4.04 miles (6.50 km) were maintained by Pennsylvania Department of Transportation (PennDOT) and 5.43 miles (8.74 km) were maintained by the township.

Interstate 95 is the most prominent highway passing through Lower Chichester Township, following a southwest-to-northeast alignment through the western portion of the township. However, the nearest exit is in Upper Chichester Township. Pennsylvania Route 452 follows Market Street along a northwest-to-southeast alignment across the northeastern portion of the township, while Pennsylvania Route 491 does likewise along Naamans Creek Road in the southwestern portion of the township.
