= Curly Ogden =

American baseball player (1901-1964)

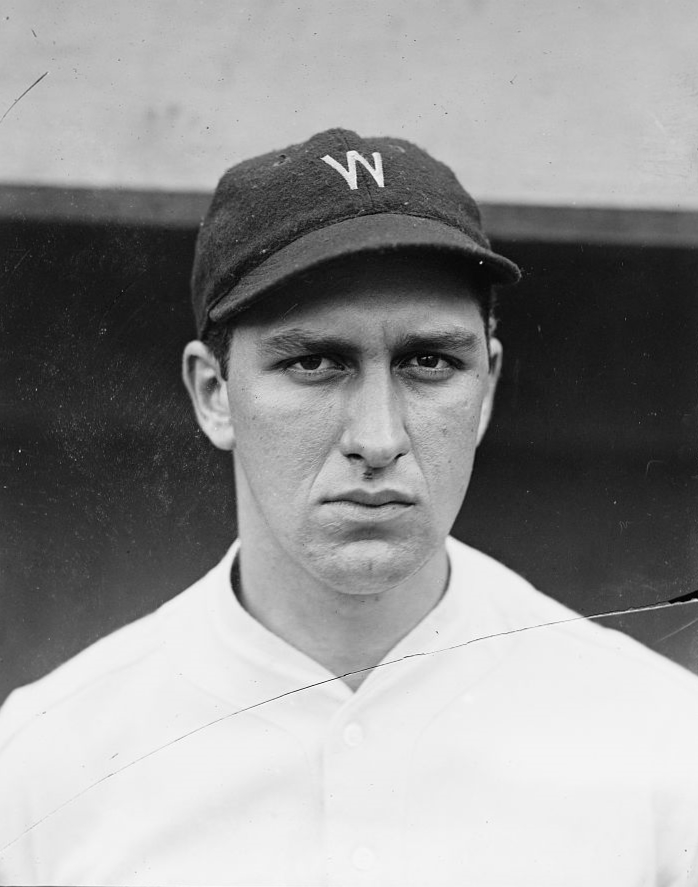
- Pitcher
- Born: January 24, 1901; Ogden, Pennsylvania, U.S.
- Died: August 6, 1964 (aged 63); Upland, Pennsylvania, U.S.
- Batted: Right Threw: Right

MLB debut
- July 18, 1922, for the Philadelphia Athletics

Last MLB appearance
- July 21, 1926, for the Washington Senators

MLB statistics
- Win–loss record: 18–19
- Earned run average: 3.79
- Strikeouts: 88
- Stats at Baseball Reference

Teams
- Philadelphia Athletics (1922–1924); Washington Senators (1924–1926)

Career highlights and awards
- World Series champion (1924)

Warren Harvey "Curly" Ogden (January 24, 1901 – August 6, 1964) was an American professional baseball pitcher. He played in Major League Baseball (MLB) from 1922 to 1926 for the Philadelphia Athletics and Washington Senators.

== Early life and education ==
Ogden was born in Ogden, Pennsylvania on January 24, 1901. The town is named after Ogden's family, who lived on the land now known as Upper Chichester, Southwest of Philadelphia for generations. Ogden's ancestor had come to America from England on the same ship as William Penn. Ogden was a three sport athlete at Chester High School.

Ogeden attended Swarthmore College, pitched for the baseball team, was a member of the Student Army Training Corps and graduated with a bachelor's degree in chemistry in 1922.

== Career ==
Before the 1922 baseball season, Ogden was signed by the Philadelphia Athletics as an amateur free agent. He was brought straight to the majors and made his debut against Cleveland in Philadelphia on July 18, 1922.

On May 23, 1924, Ogden was selected off waivers by the Washington Senators from the Philadelphia Athletics. Ogden was the starting pitcher for the Washington Senators in the final game of the 1924 World Series, which they won in 12 innings. The right-hander was something of a decoy in that Game 7, given his first start of the Series as a ploy by Senators manager Bucky Harris to get the opposition to load its lineup with left-handed hitters. Harris then removed Ogden after two batters and replaced him with the left-handed pitcher George Mogridge, making Ogden one of the earliest known examples of an "opener".

Ogden spent three seasons with the Senators from 1924 to 1926, making 29 starts. On March 27, 1927, Ogden was purchased by the International League Baltimore Orioles from the Washington Senators. Ogden continued playing minor league baseball for the Toledo Mud Hens in the American Association and Toronto, Jersey City and Montreal in the International League into the 1934 season before retiring.

After his professional baseball career, Ogden taught and coached for 18 years at Penns Grove High School in Penns Grove, New Jersey.

== Personal life ==
Ogden's older brother, Jack Ogden, also attended Swarthmore College, pitched in the major leagues for the New York Giants, St. Louis Browns and Cincinnati Reds and is a member of the International League Hall of Fame. In November 1932, Ogden married Alice Marker of Chester, Pennsylvania. Together they had a daughter, Helen, born in 1934. Ogden died on August 6, 1964, and is interred at the Lawn Croft Cemetery in Linwood, Pennsylvania.
