= Trainer, Pennsylvania =

Borough in Pennsylvania, US

- Borough
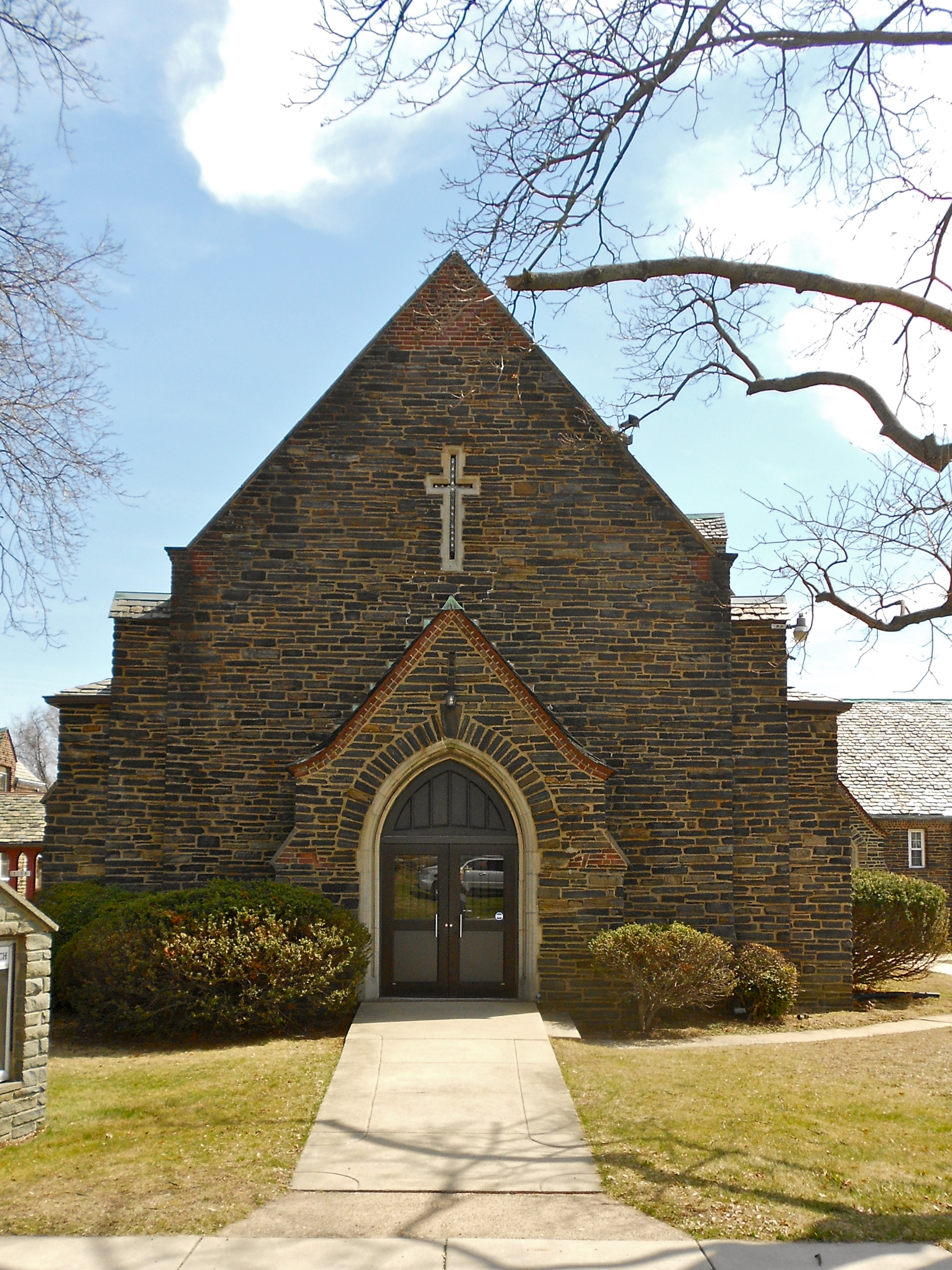
- Trainer United Methodist Church

- Location in Delaware County and the U.S. state of Pennsylvania.

- Location of Trainer in Pennsylvania Trainer (the United States)
- Coordinates: 39°49′43″N 75°24′13″W
- Country: United States
- State: Pennsylvania
- County: Delaware

Area
  - Total: 1.37 sq mi (3.56 km^{2})
  - Land: 1.06 sq mi (2.74 km^{2})
  - Water: 0.32 sq mi (0.82 km^{2})
- Elevation: 72 ft (22 m)

Population (2010)
  - Total: 1,828
  - Estimate (2019): 1,836
  - Density: 1,737.7/sq mi (670.94/km^{2})
- Time zone: UTC-5 (EST)
  - Summer (DST): UTC-4 (EDT)
- ZIP code: 19061
- Area codes: 610 and 484
- FIPS code: 42-045-77288
- FIPS code: 42-77288
- GNIS feature ID: 1189711
- Website: www.trainerboro.com

Trainer is a borough in Delaware County, Pennsylvania, United States. As of the 2020 census, Trainer had a population of 1,976. The borough was named after David Trainer, a wealthy textile manufacturer.

== History ==
Trainer is named after the Linwood Mills owner David Trainer Sr. The borough of Trainer was originally part of Lower Chichester Township and was incorporated as a borough in 1919.

== Geography ==
Trainer is located in southern Delaware County at 39°49′43″N 75°24′13″W (39.828612, -75.403599), on the northwest bank of the Delaware River. It is bordered to the southwest by the borough of Marcus Hook, to the west by the community of Linwood in Lower Chichester Township, to the north by Upper Chichester Township, to the east by the city of Chester, and to the south across the Delaware River by Gloucester County, New Jersey.

Stoney Creek passes through the town, emptying into the Delaware River.

According to the United States Census Bureau, the borough has a total area of 1.4 square miles (3.6 km^{2}), of which 1.0 square mile (2.7 km^{2}) is land and 0.31 square miles (0.8 km^{2}), or 22.94%, is water.

== Transportation ==
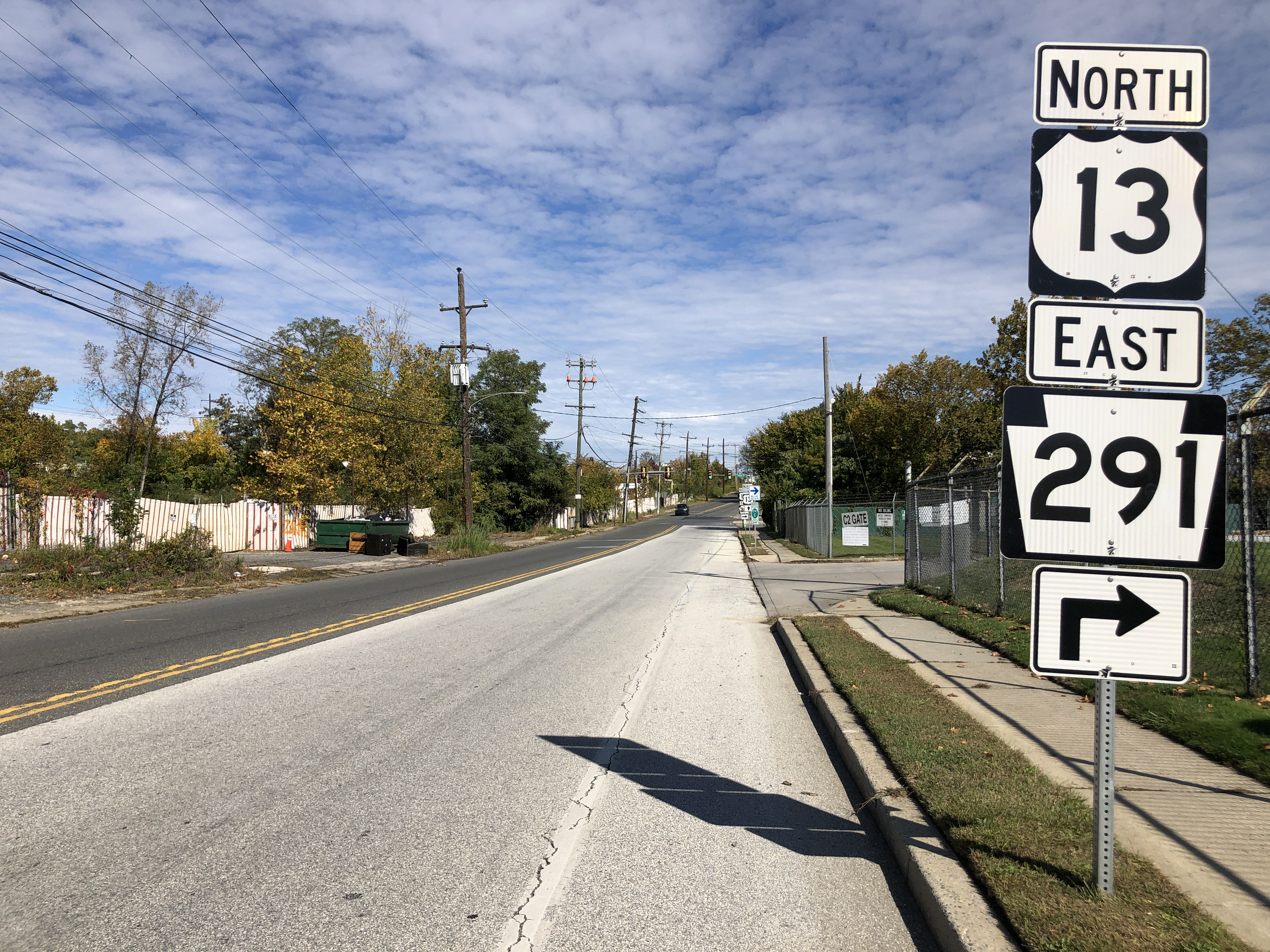
US 13 northbound approaching PA 291 and US 13 Business in Trainer

As of 2018 there were 8.18 miles (13.16 km) of public roads in Trainer, of which 3.21 miles (5.17 km) were maintained by the Pennsylvania Department of Transportation (PennDOT) and 4.97 miles (8.00 km) were maintained by the borough.

U.S. Route 13 crosses the central portion of Trainer, leading northeast through Chester 18 miles (29 km) to Philadelphia and southwest 10 miles (16 km) to Wilmington, Delaware. Pennsylvania Route 291 reaches its western terminus at US 13 in the borough. U.S. Route 13 Business also terminates at the junction of US 13 and PA 291 in Trainer.

== Petroleum and port ==
The shore of the Delaware River is heavily industrialized and is an extension of the Port of Chester. The Stoney Creek Secondary has a rail yard north of its namesake. Delta Air Lines owns an oil refinery in Trainer called the Trainer Refinery. It purchased the refinery for $180 million from Phillips 66 in 2012.

== Educational system ==
Trainer is a part of Chichester School District. Children within the borough usually attend Marcus Hook Elementary School (Grades K-4), Chichester Middle School (Grades 5–8), or Chichester High School (Grades 9–12).

Trainer Elementary School closed in 1984. There were plans to reopen the school in 1989, but the reopening did not happen.

The area Catholic K-8 school is Holy Family Regional Catholic School in Aston. Trainer previously was served by Resurrection of Our Lord School in Chester. It closed in 1993, with Trainer students moved to what became Holy Savior-St. John Fisher School in Linwood, which in turn merged into Holy Family in 2012.

== Demographics ==
Historical population
Census	Pop.	Note	%±
1920	1,367		—
1930	1,648		20.6%
1940	1,716		4.1%
1950	2,001		16.6%
1960	2,358		17.8%
1970	2,336		−0.9%
1980	2,056		−12.0%
1990	2,271		10.5%
2000	1,901		−16.3%
2010	1,828		−3.8%
2020	1,976		8.1%

As of Census 2010, the racial makeup of the borough was 76.4% White, 18.9% African American, 0.3% Native American, 0.5% Asian, 1.7% from other races, and 2.2% from two or more races. Hispanic or Latino of any race were 5.5% of the population .

As of the census of 2000, there were 1,901 people, 712 households, and 489 families residing in the borough. The population density was 1,801.3 inhabitants per square mile (695.5/km^{2}). There were 797 housing units at an average density of 755.2 per square mile (291.6/km^{2}). The racial makeup of the borough was 88.58% White, 9.21% African American, 0.05% Native American, 0.16% Asian, 1.00% from other races, and 1.00% from two or more races. Hispanic or Latino of any race were 2.52% of the population.

There were 712 households, out of which 32.3% had children under the age of 18 living with them, 44.7% were married couples living together, 17.7% had a female householder with no husband present, and 31.2% were non-families. 27.1% of all households were made up of individuals, and 12.4% had someone living alone who was 65 years of age or older. The average household size was 2.67 and the average family size was 3.23.

In the borough the population was spread out, with 27.7% under the age of 18, 7.8% from 18 to 24, 29.3% from 25 to 44, 21.3% from 45 to 64, and 13.9% who were 65 years of age or older. The median age was 36 years. For every 100 females, there were 95.8 males. For every 100 females age 18 and over, there were 93.2 males.

The median income for a household in the borough was $34,250, and the median income for a family was $45,625. Males had a median income of $39,293 versus $26,719 for females. The per capita income for the borough was $15,753. About 14.9% of families and 16.5% of the population were below the poverty line, including 18.2% of those under age 18 and 13.1% of those age 65 or over.
