= Chichester Friends Meetinghouse =

Historic church in Pennsylvania, United States

- U.S. National Register of Historic Places
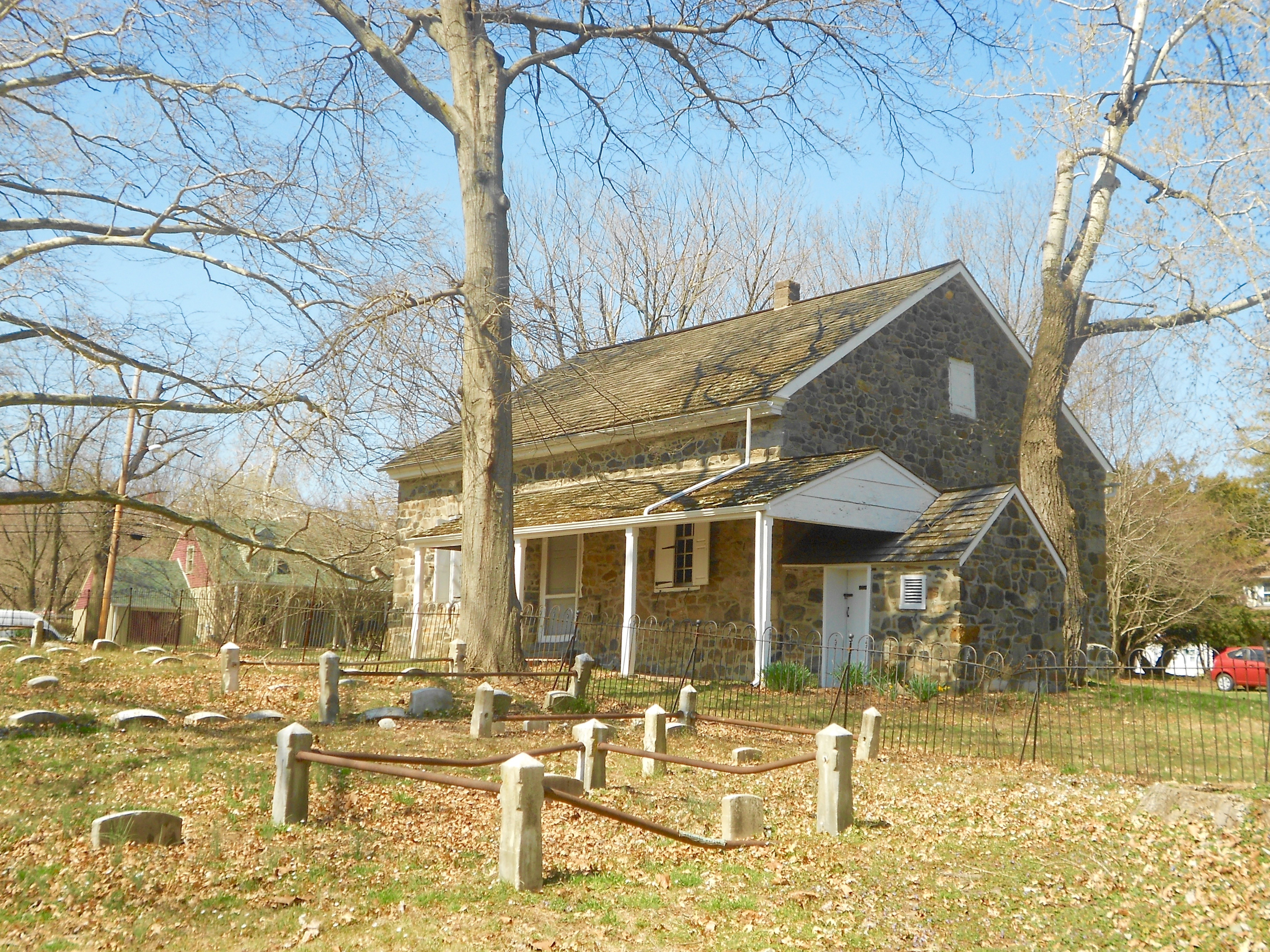
- Chichester Friends Meetinghouse

- Location within Pennsylvania Location within the United States
- Location: 611 Meetinghouse Rd., Boothwyn, Pennsylvania
- Coordinates: 39°50′11″N 75°25′53″W
- Area: 6 acres (2.4 ha)
- Built: 1769
- NRHP reference No.: 73001622
- Added to NRHP: March 14, 1973

Chichester Friends Meetinghouse is a historic Quaker meeting house at 611 Meetinghouse Road near Boothwyn, in Upper Chichester Township, Delaware County, Pennsylvania. This area, near Chester, was one of the earliest areas settled by Quakers in Pennsylvania. The meetinghouse, first built in 1688, then rebuilt after a fire in 1769, reflects this early Quaker heritage. The building was added to the National Register of Historic Places in 1973.

== History ==
In the year that William Penn first arrived in Pennsylvania, 1682, the Chichester Meeting was first organized as an "indulged meeting" or subsidiary meeting of the Uplands Monthly Meeting of present-day Chester. The Uplands Meeting had been organized by Robert Wade, who arrived in the area in 1675, from earlier Quaker settlements in New Jersey. Chichester attained the status of Monthly Meeting in March, 1684. This group of Friends met in member's homes until about 1688 when a 24-foot (7.3 m) square meetinghouse was built on two acres. The land was sold on October 4, 1688 by James Brown for 1 shilling and sixpence "only for the use of the people of God, called Quakers." In January 1769 the meetinghouse burned down, and later that year a 33 by 38-foot (12 m) building was erected in its place.

The doors show bullet holes incurred from British foraging parties after the Battle of Brandywine in September, 1777. In 1793 a school was organized at the meetinghouse and it continued until 1836 when the state mandated public education.

About 1827, the time of the Orthodox-Hicksite separation, two meetings were established in the building. The Orthodox branch was "laid down" or discontinued in 1880. The Hicksite branch was discontinued in 1914. Since then the meetinghouse has only been used for special occasions. No modern conveniences such as heat, plumbing or electricity have been added to the building, so it is considered to be in pristine condition.

It was illegal to build Quaker meetinghouses in England until the Act of Toleration of 1689. Because meetinghouses were built in this area of Pennsylvania at an earlier date, and because the 1769 meetinghouse is believed to reflect the style of the earlier meetinghouse, the Chichester Meetinghouse is believed to show an early "English" style of Quaker architecture.

A caretaker's house was built in 1703 and in 1783 a two-story barn with a six bay shed was built. Both buildings are still in use.

== Gallery ==
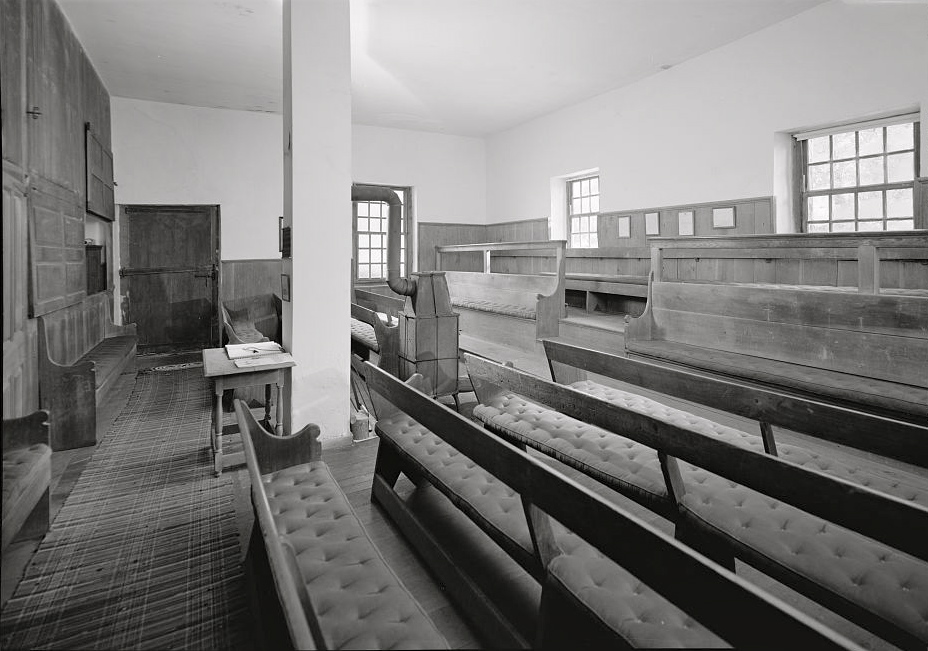
Interior

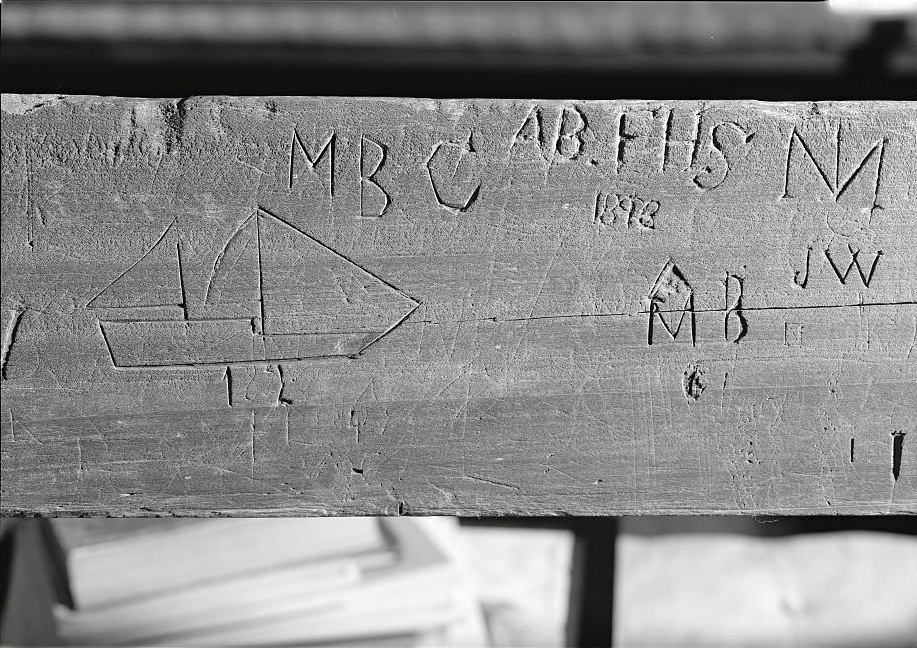
Carved graffiti

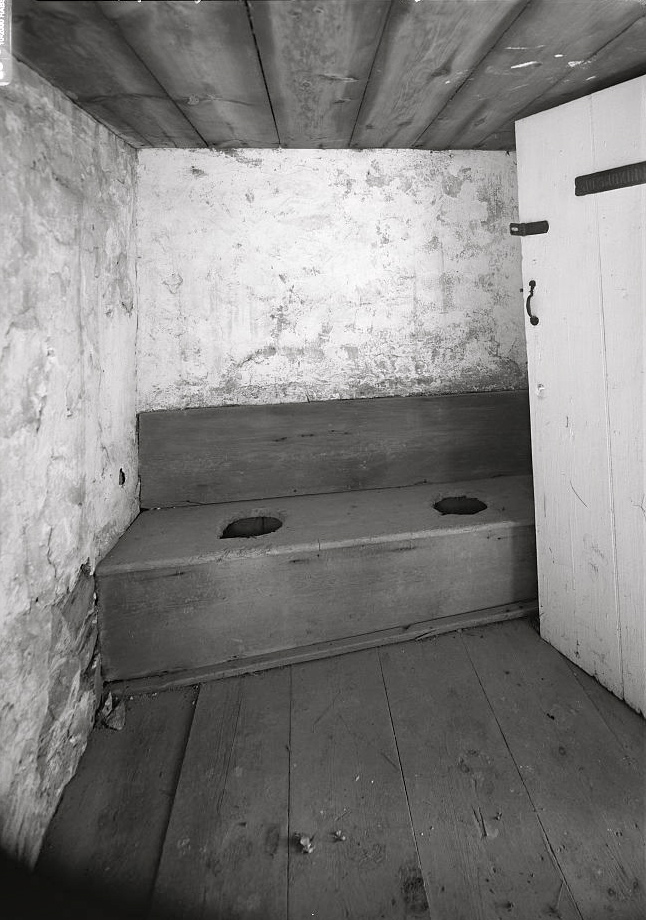
Conveniences

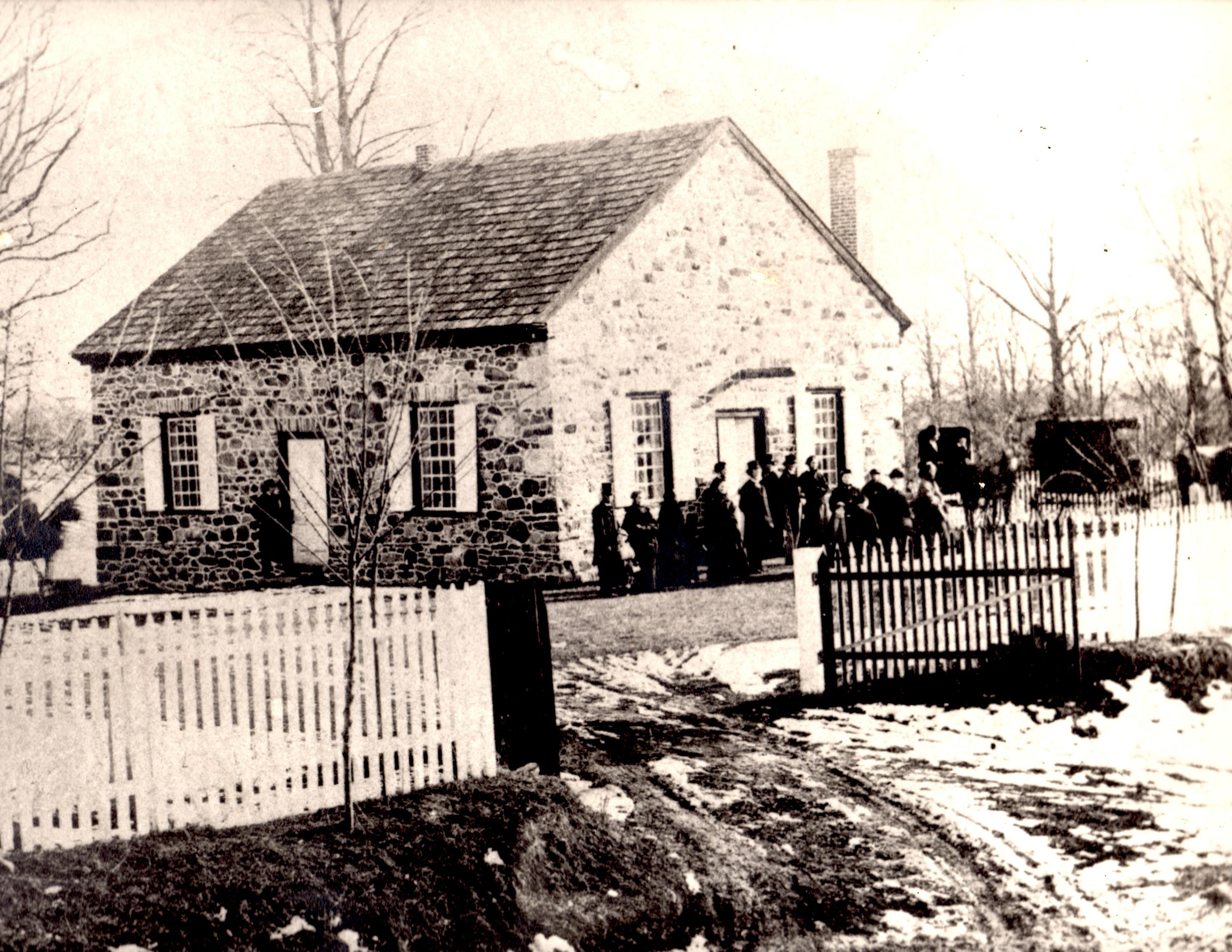
In the 19th century
