= Boothwyn, Pennsylvania =

Unincorporated community in Pennsylvania, US

- Census-designated place
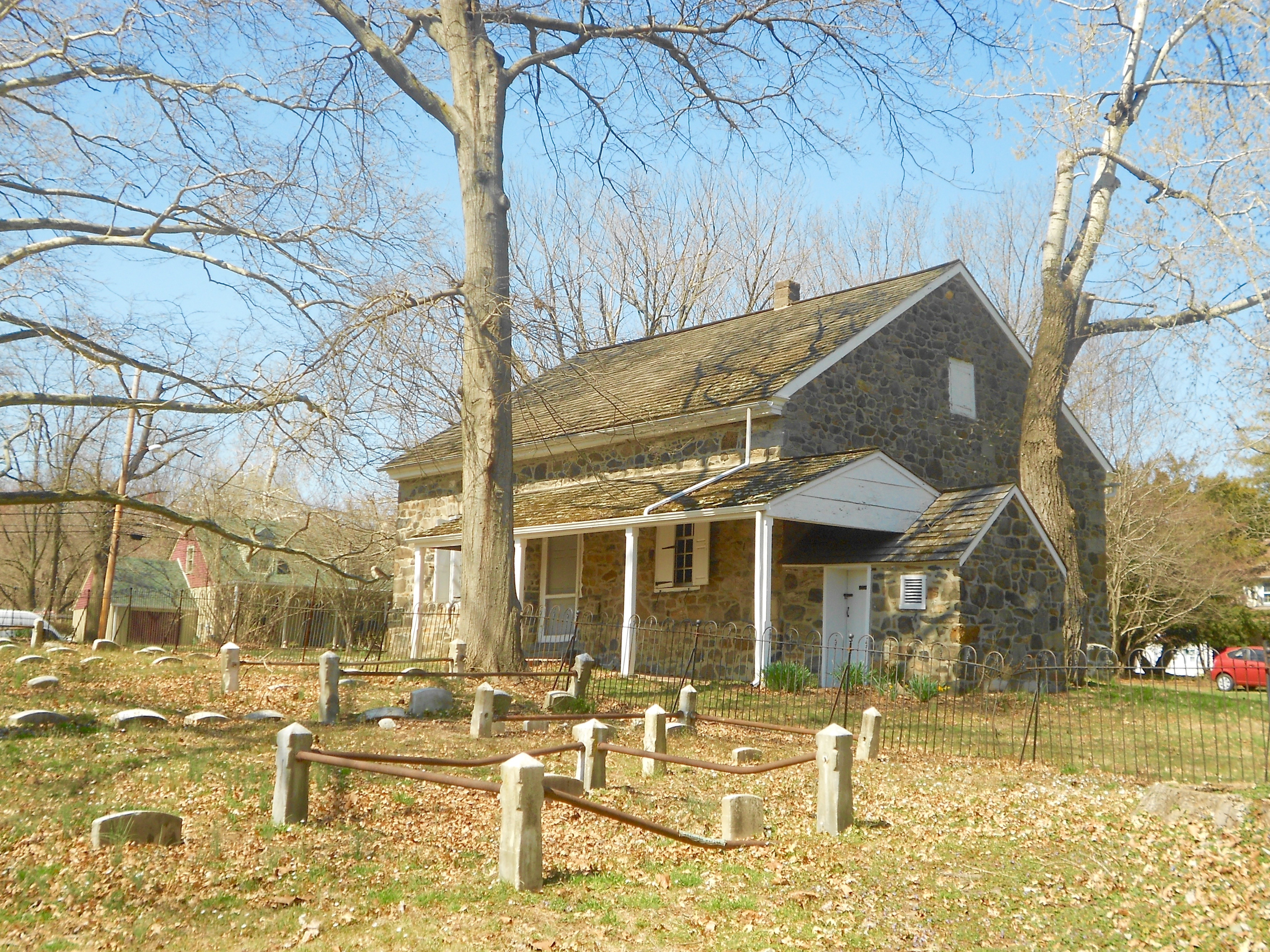
- Chichester Friends Meetinghouse

- Location in Delaware County and the U.S. state of Pennsylvania
- Coordinates: 39°50′06″N 75°26′40″W
- Country: United States
- State: Pennsylvania
- County: Delaware
- Township: Upper Chichester

Area
  - Total: 1.25 sq mi (3.23 km^{2})
  - Land: 1.25 sq mi (3.23 km^{2})
  - Water: 0 sq mi (0.00 km^{2})
- Elevation: 98 ft (30 m)

Population (2020)
  - Total: 4,968
  - Density: 3,982/sq mi (1,537.6/km^{2})
- Time zone: UTC-5 (EST)
  - Summer (DST): UTC-4 (EDT)
- ZIP code: 19061
- Area codes: 610 and 484
- FIPS code: 42-07616

Boothwyn is a census-designated place (CDP) in Upper Chichester Township, Pennsylvania, United States. The population was 4,933 at the 2010 census, down from 5,206 at the 2000 census.

== History ==
The Chichester Friends Meeting, which was organized in 1682, with the current building constructed in 1769, is listed on the National Register of Historic Places. Bill Haley, who pioneered Rock n' Roll with Bill Haley & His Comets, was a long-time resident of Boothwyn.

Local Favorite and Pennsylvania Amish Market "Booth's Corner" is within the Bounds of Boothwyn, built at the corner of the old land holdings of Edwin Booth, who gives the building and Boothwyn its name.

== Geography ==
Boothwyn is located in southwestern Delaware County at 39°50′6″N 75°26′40″W (39.835115, -75.444507), in the southern part of Upper Chichester Township. The CDP contains the unincorporated communities of Boothwyn (southern part of the CDP) and Gardendale (northern part). Boothwyn is 6 miles (10 km) southwest of Chester and 10 miles (16 km) northeast of Wilmington, Delaware.

According to the United States Census Bureau, the CDP has a total area of 1.25 square miles (3.23 km^{2}), all land.

The Boothwyn, Reliance, and Ogden fire companies are located in Boothwyn.

== Educational system ==
Boothwyn is a part of Chichester School District. Children within the area usually attend Boothwyn Elementary School or Hilltop School (Grades K-4), Chichester Middle School (Grades 5–8), or Chichester High School (Grades 9–12).

Holy Family Regional Catholic School in Aston, of the Roman Catholic Archdiocese of Philadelphia, is the area Catholic school. It formed in 2012 from a merger of Holy Savior-St. John Fisher Elementary School in Linwood and St. Joseph Catholic School in Aston. Holy Savior School opened in 1917, and changed its name after St. John Fisher Church was established in Boothwyn in 1971 as the school at that time became the parish school of St. John Fisher.

== Demographics ==
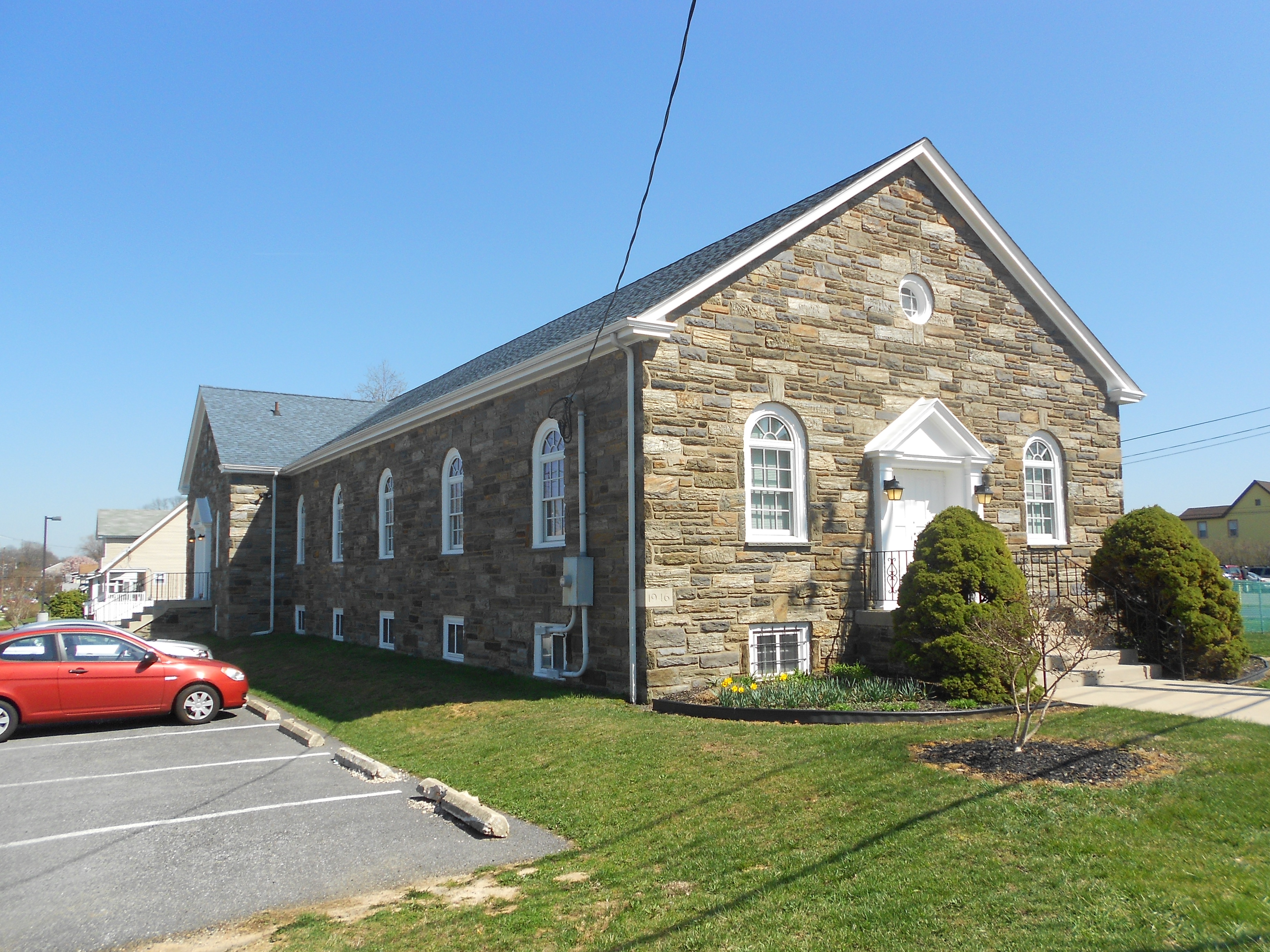
Boothwyn Reformed Presbyterian Church

=== 2020 census ===
As of the 2020 census, Boothwyn had a population of 4,968. The median age was 39.2 years. 17.2% of residents were under the age of 18 and 15.7% of residents were 65 years of age or older. For every 100 females there were 96.9 males, and for every 100 females age 18 and over there were 96.6 males age 18 and over.

100.0% of residents lived in urban areas, while 0.0% lived in rural areas.

There were 2,087 households in Boothwyn, of which 23.3% had children under the age of 18 living in them. Of all households, 40.9% were married-couple households, 23.0% were households with a male householder and no spouse or partner present, and 28.5% were households with a female householder and no spouse or partner present. About 29.8% of all households were made up of individuals and 11.1% had someone living alone who was 65 years of age or older.

There were 2,199 housing units, of which 5.1% were vacant. The homeowner vacancy rate was 0.9% and the rental vacancy rate was 4.6%.

Racial composition as of the 2020 census
Race	Number	Percent
White	3,823	77.0%
Black or African American	676	13.6%
American Indian and Alaska Native	4	0.1%
Asian	138	2.8%
Native Hawaiian and Other Pacific Islander	2	0.0%
Some other race	68	1.4%
Two or more races	257	5.2%
Hispanic or Latino (of any race)	220	4.4%

=== 2000 census ===
As of the census of 2000, there were 5,206 people, 2,047 households, and 1,367 families residing in the CDP. The population density was 4,236.1 inhabitants per square mile (1,635.6/km^{2}). There were 2,126 housing units at an average density of 1,729.9 per square mile (667.9/km^{2}). The racial makeup of the CDP was 80.70% White, 6.13% African American, 0.10% Native American, 1.67% Asian, 0.02% Pacific Islander, 0.40% from other races, and 0.98% from two or more races. Hispanic or Latino of any race were 10.11% of the population.

There were 2,047 households, out of which 29.0% had children under the age of 18 living with them, 49.6% were married couples living together, 12.7% had a female householder with no husband present, and 33.2% were non-families. 26.4% of all households were made up of individuals, and 9.2% had someone living alone who was 65 years of age or older. The average household size was 2.54 and the average family size was 3.12.

In the CDP, the population was spread out, with 22.7% under the age of 18, 9.0% from 18 to 24, 31.8% from 25 to 44, 23.7% from 45 to 64, and 12.8% who were 65 years of age or older. The median age was 37 years. For every 100 females, there were 91.6 males. For every 100 females age 18 and over, there were 89.3 males.

The median income for a household in the CDP was $46,433, and the median income for a family was $60,096. Males had a median income of $41,793 versus $29,962 for females. The per capita income for the CDP was $23,811. About 6.7% of families and 6.2% of the population were below the poverty line, including 9.2% of those under age 18 and 7.1% of those age 65 or over.

Historical population
Census	Pop.	Note	%±
2000	5,206		—
2010	4,933		−5.2%
2020	4,968		0.7%

== Notable people ==
- Bill Haley, Rock and Roll musician
- Billy "White Shoes" Johnson, NFL player
