= Upper Chichester Township, Pennsylvania =

Township in Pennsylvania, US

- Township
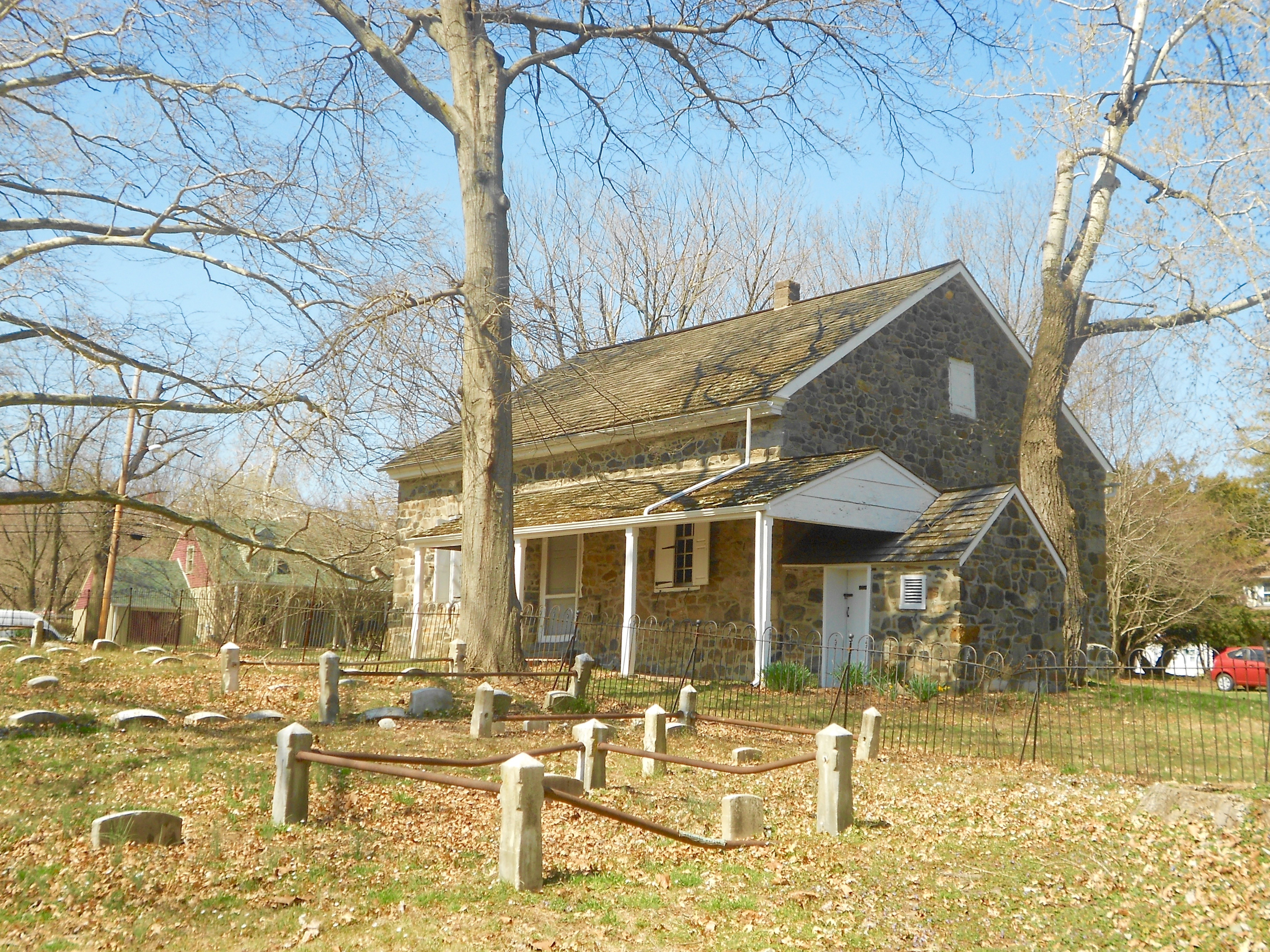
- Chichester Friends Meetinghouse

- Location in Delaware County and the state of Pennsylvania.

- Location of Pennsylvania in the United States
- Coordinates: 39°50′18″N 75°26′26″W
- Country: United States
- State: Pennsylvania
- County: Delaware

Area
  - Total: 6.70 sq mi (17.34 km^{2})
  - Land: 6.69 sq mi (17.32 km^{2})
  - Water: 0.0077 sq mi (0.02 km^{2})
- Elevation: 98 ft (30 m)

Population (2010)
  - Total: 16,738
  - Estimate (2016): 16,992
  - Density: 2,540.8/sq mi (980.99/km^{2})
- Time zone: UTC-5 (EST)
  - Summer (DST): UTC-4 (EDT)
- ZIP code: 19061
- Area code: 610
- FIPS code: 42-045-78776
- Communities: Boothwyn; Ogden; Twin Oaks
- Website: www.upperchichester.org

Upper Chichester Township is a civil township in Delaware County, Pennsylvania, United States. The population was 16,738 at the 2010 census.

== History ==
The Lenni Lenape Indians were the earliest occupants of Upper Chichester. They erected several semi-permanent villages in the area tied to fishing and hunting cycles with some farming.

The Upper Chichester area was claimed by New Sweden in 1643 and the Dutch in 1654, but both nations were primarily interested in trading with the Lenni Lenape Indians.

The first European settlers to Upper Chichester were in 1681 under the Penn's Grant of land to William Penn from King Charles II. The first purchasers under Penn's authority were fourteen English and Welshmen, mostly Quakers.

Upper Chichester Township was originally part of the section of Chester County called Chichester. Chichester comprised the area now known as Upper and Lower Chichester. It is named after the town Chichester in West Sussex, England from which many of its settlers came from.

Upper Chichester Township, at the time called "Chichester Liberty," is considered by most to be one of the first settlements within the land grant of Pennsylvania.

Among the earliest settlers of the township was Walter Martin, the founder of St. Martin's Church, in the late 17th century. The road from Chichester to Aston traversing the township almost due north, was laid out 1688, while the Upper Chichester road was laid out on October 25, 1687. At the southwestern limit of the territory was a tract of 250 acres (100 ha), which was located September 5 and 6, 1681. The "Twelve-Mile Circle" (the circular northern boundary line of the state of Delaware) traverses this tract.

The division of Chichester into Upper and Lower Chichester was made early in 1700 to facilitate public business. In 1753, an effort was made to have the division officially recognized. The movement was, however, met by sturdy opposition from the leading citizens and land-owners of Lower Chichester, stating that the township as it currently stood was convenient enough and did not need any separation. They further argued that recent work to mend the highways in Lower Chichester, and the need to provide for several poor in the township were more important uses of funds than the cost of the survey.

The matter was permitted to drag along for six years, during which time the reasons for the official recognition of the separation of the two townships became apparent to all. In August 1759, a petition to formally separate the two townships was presented, bearing the signatures of almost every freeholder in Upper and Lower Chichester as well as those in Nether Providence.

Edwin Booth, a significant land owner within Upper Chichester Township, is the namesake for the town of Boothwyn within Upper Chichester Township Boundaries. Local Pennsylvania Amish market "Booth's Corner" also inherit's his name and rests on the upper left corner of Booth's former land holdings.

Upper Chichester became a first class township on December 30, 1941.

The Chichester Friends Meetinghouse is listed on the National Register of Historic Places.

== Geography ==
Upper Chichester Township is in southwestern Delaware County, west of the city of Chester. It is bordered to the south by the state of Delaware, to the west by Bethel Township, to the north by Aston Township, to the east by Chester Township and the city of Chester, and to the south by the borough of Trainer and Lower Chichester Township. The unincorporated community of Boothwyn is in the center and southern part of the township.

According to the United States Census Bureau, the township has a total area of 6.70 square miles (17.34 km^{2}), of which 6.69 square miles (17.32 km^{2}) is land and 0.01 square miles (0.03 km^{2}), or 0.15%, is water.

Waterways in Upper Chichester include Naaman's Creek and Marcus Hook Creek.

== Educational system ==
Upper Chichester is a part of Chichester School District. Children within the township usually attend Boothwyn Elementary School (Grades K-4) or Hilltop Elementary School (Grades K-4), Chichester Middle School (Grades 5-8), & Chichester High School (Grades 9-12).

== Demographics ==
Historical population
Census	Pop.	Note	%±
1930	3,743		—
1940	5,280		41.1%
1950	6,997		32.5%
1960	9,682		38.4%
1970	11,414		17.9%
1980	14,377		26.0%
1990	15,044		4.6%
2000	16,842		12.0%
2010	16,738		−0.6%
2020	16,898		1.0%
U.S. Decennial Census

As of Census 2010, the racial makeup of the township was 84.0% White, 10.7% African American, 0.3% Native American, 2.7% Asian, 0.5% from other races, and 1.8% from two or more races. Hispanic or Latino of any race were 2.4% of the population .

As of the census of 2000, there were 16,842 people, 6,500 households, and 4,439 families residing in the township. The population density was 2,508.2 inhabitants per square mile (968.4/km^{2}). There were 6,705 housing units at an average density of 998.5 per square mile (385.5/km^{2}). The racial makeup of the township was 86.00% White, 10.36% African American, 0.18% Native American, 2.02% Asian, 0.01% Pacific Islander, 0.30% from other races, and 1.14% from two or more races. Hispanic or Latino of any race were 1.16% of the population.

There were 6,500 households, out of which 30.3% had children under the age of 18 living with them, 52.9% were married couples living together, 11.2% had a female householder with no husband present, and 31.7% were non-families. 26.0% of all households were made up of individuals, and 10.9% had someone living alone who was 65 years of age or older. The average household size was 2.58 and the average family size was 3.15.

In the township the population was spread out, with 23.6% under the age of 18, 8.0% from 18 to 24, 32.6% from 25 to 44, 22.9% from 45 to 64, and 12.9% who were 65 years of age or older. The median age was 37 years. For every 100 females, there were 90.9 males. For every 100 females age 18 and over, there were 88.2 males.

The median income for a household in the township was $53,962, and the median income for a family was $63,125. Males had a median income of $43,159 versus $31,349 for females. The per capita income for the township was $23,412. About 4.2% of families and 5.5% of the population were below the poverty line, including 8.1% of those under age 18 and 7.8% of those age 65 or over.

== Transportation ==
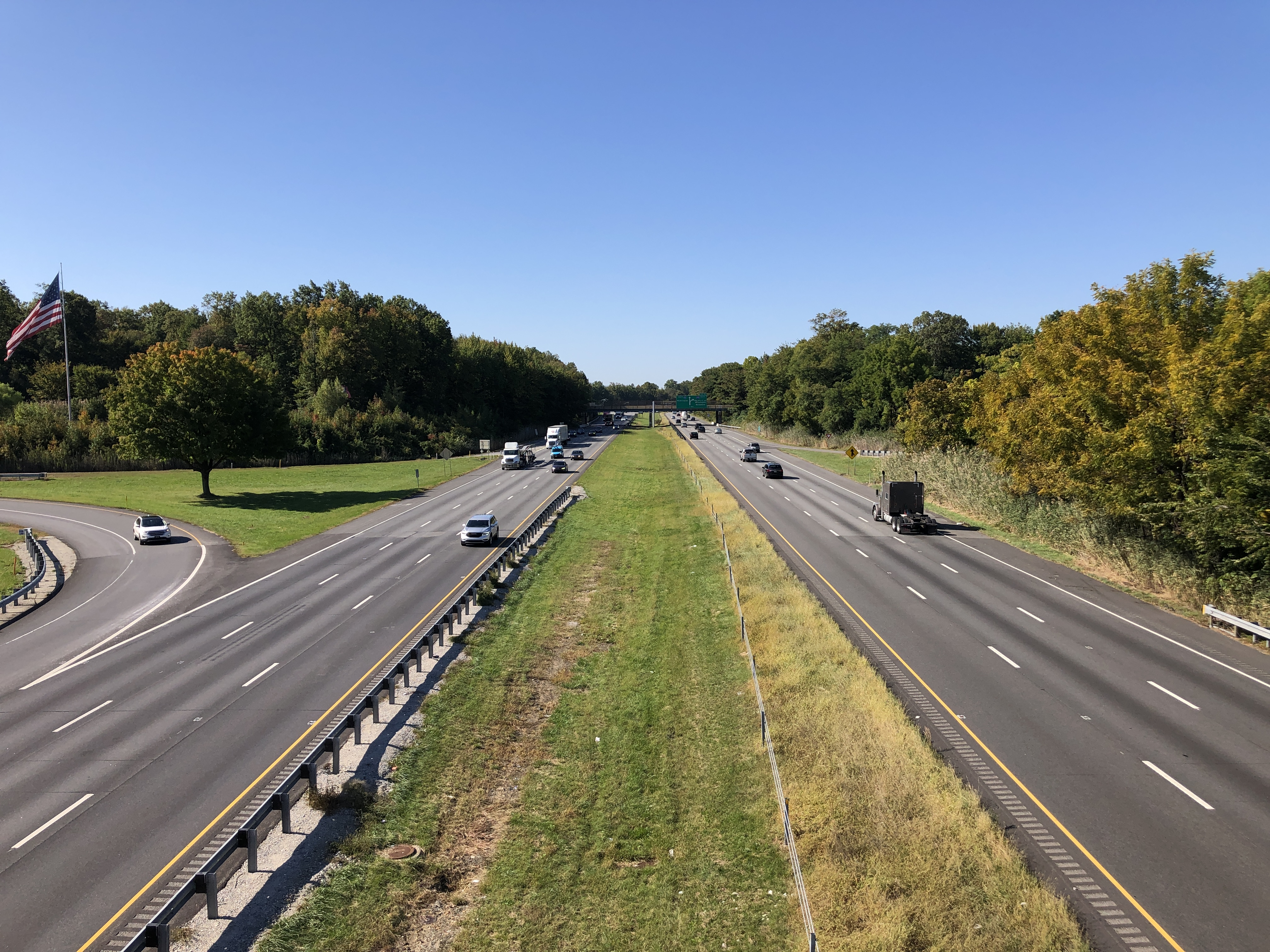
I-95 southbound in Upper Chichester Township

As of 2020, there were 67.53 miles (108.68 km) of public roads in Upper Chichester Township, of which 20.81 miles (33.49 km) were maintained by Pennsylvania Department of Transportation (PennDOT) and 46.72 miles (75.19 km) were maintained by the township.

Interstate 95 is the main highway serving Upper Chichester Township. It follows the Delaware Expressway along a southwest-to-northeast alignment through the southeastern section of the township. U.S. Route 322 interchanges with I-95 at the township's eastern border and heads northwestward along Conchester Highway through northern portions of the township. Pennsylvania Route 452 follows Market Street along a north-south alignment through eastern portions of the township. Finally, Pennsylvania Route 491 follows Naamans Creek Road along a northwest-southeast alignment across southwestern portions of the township.

== Notable people ==
- Anna Broomall, pioneering obstetrician
- John Martin Broomall, U.S. Representative
- Peirce Crosby, Rear Admiral in the U.S. Navy
- Curly Ogden, Major League Baseball pitcher
- Jack Ogden, Major League Baseball pitcher
- Ron Bennington, Radio Host & Comedian
