= Chichester School District =

School district in Pennsylvania

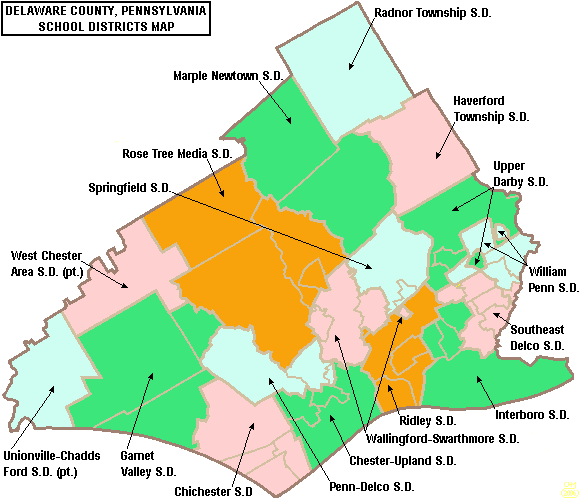

Address
- 401 Cherry Tree Road Aston, Delaware County, Pennsylvania, 19014; United States

District information
- Type: Public

Students and staff
- District mascot: Eagle
- Colors: Maroon and gray

Other information
- Website: http://www.chichestersd.org/

The Chichester School District (CSD) is a suburban public school district located in southeastern Delaware County, Pennsylvania. It encompasses approximately 10 square miles (26 km^{2}), covering the Boroughs of Marcus Hook, Trainer, Lower Chichester Township, and Upper Chichester Township in Delaware County. According to 2000 federal census data, Chichester School District serves a resident population of 24,648. In 2009, the district residents’ per capita income was $20,972, while the median family income was $57,240. In the Commonwealth, the median family income was $49,501 and the United States median family income was $49,445 in 2010.

Chichester School District is often incorrectly considered part of Aston, Pennsylvania because of the zip-code of the location where the school district is based out of is in Twin Oaks, Pennsylvania (Part of Chichester, Pennsylvania, but commonly associated with the Aston zip-code).

== Schools ==
- Chichester High School (9th–12th) is currently the only high school in the Chichester School District. It is located in Boothwyn, Pennsylvania.
- Chichester Middle School (5th–8th) is currently the only middle school in the Chichester School District. It is located in Boothwyn, Pennsylvania.

There are currently four public elementary schools serving the school district:

- Boothwyn Elementary School (K–4th)
- Hilltop Elementary School (K–4th)
- Linwood Elementary School (K–4th)
- Marcus Hook Elementary School (K–4th)
- Trainer Elementary School previously served the Borough of Trainer. Trainer Elementary School closed in 1984. There were plans to reopen the school in 1989, but the reopening did not happen. Students now attend Marcus Hook Elementary School.
