= Aston Township, Pennsylvania =

Township in Pennsylvania, US

- Township
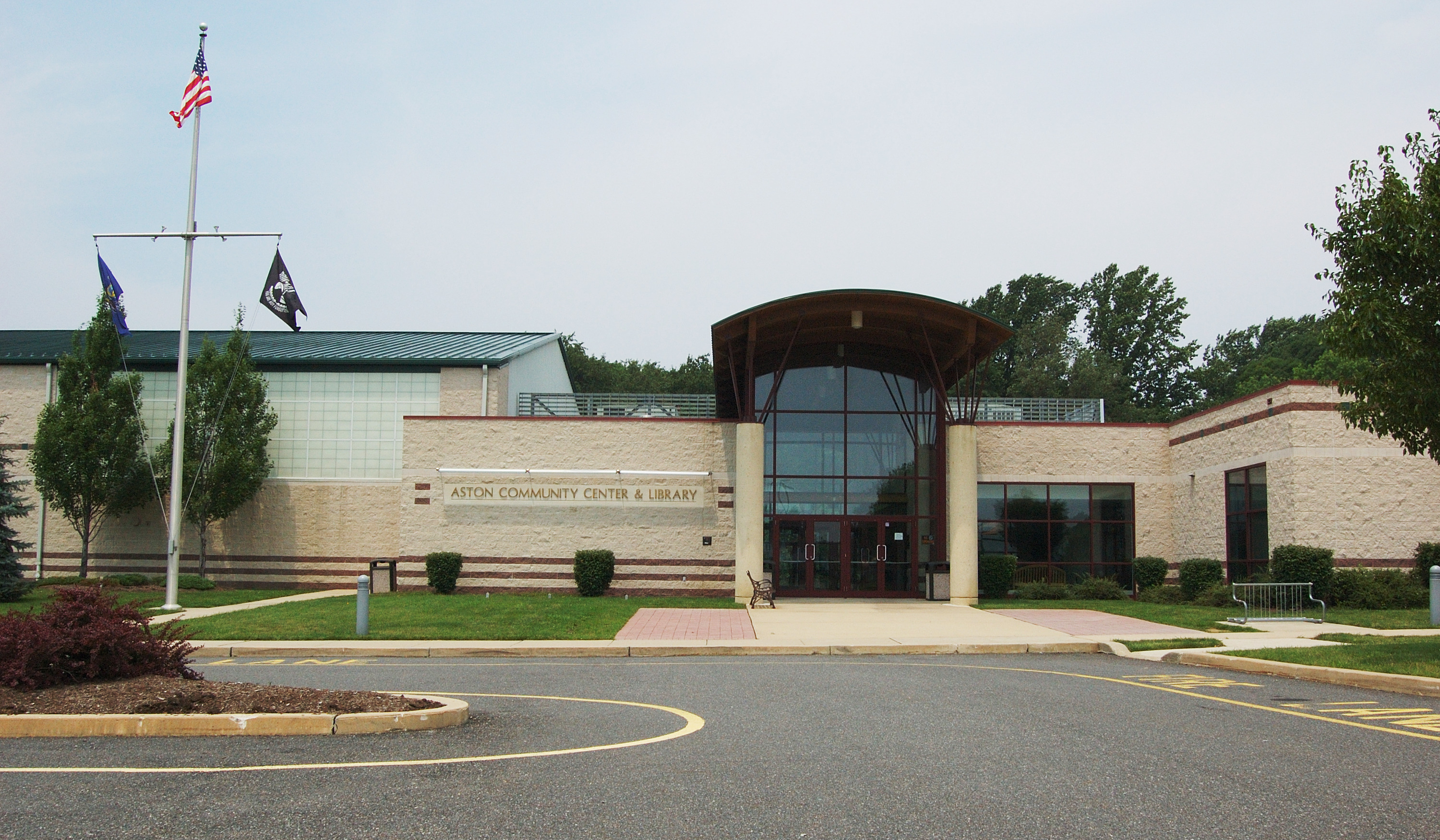
- Aston Community Center and Library

- Flag Seal

- Location in Delaware County and the state of Pennsylvania.

- Location of Pennsylvania in the United States
- Coordinates: 39°52′09″N 75°25′50″W
- Country: United States
- State: Pennsylvania
- County: Delaware
- Settled: 1682

Area
  - Total: 5.84 sq mi (15.13 km^{2})
  - Land: 5.84 sq mi (15.13 km^{2})
  - Water: 0 sq mi (0.00 km^{2})
- Elevation: 213 ft (65 m)

Population (2020)
  - Total: 16,791
  - Density: 2,874.3/sq mi (1,109.78/km^{2})
- Time zone: UTC-5 (EST)
  - Summer (DST): UTC-4 (EDT)
- ZIP Code: 19014
- Area codes: 484 and 610
- FIPS code: 42-045-03336
- FIPS code: 42-045-03336
- GNIS feature ID: 1216376
- Website: www.astontownship.net

Aston Township is a township in Delaware County, Pennsylvania, United States. As of the 2020 census, the township had a total population of 16,791, making as the 11th-largest municipality in the county by population.

== History ==
=== Indigenous History ===
Prior to European settlement, the area that is now Aston Township was inhabited by the Lenni-Lenape people. The Lenni-Lenape lived throughout southeastern Pennsylvania, including along the Delaware River and its tributaries.

Evidence of Lenape inhabitation continued into the colonial period. According to local historical accounts, a family of natives maintained a wigwam on the Aston side of Chester Creek as late as 1770.

=== Early Settlement ===
Records show that Aston was first settled in 1682 and was incorporated as a township in 1688 (one of the first townships in Pennsylvania). Prior to 1687, records show Aston was called Northley. Edward Carter, who was the constable of the township, changed the name from Northley to Aston in remembrance of his old home of Aston in Oxfordshire, England.

Historical maps from the late 17th through mid-18th centuries sometimes depict Aston under the spelling "Ashton."

=== Revolutionary and Colonial Era ===
In colonial times, Concord Road was the main road between Chadds Ford on the Brandywine Creek and the port city of Chester. The Seven Stars Inn, located at Concord Road's "Five Points" intersection, served as overnight quarters for British General Cornwallis on September 13, 1777, two days after the Battle of the Brandywine, as British forces slowly pursued George Washington's army.

The following day, three Hessian soldiers were convicted of plundering a local house. Two, selected by lot, were hanged by the third soldier, and the two corpses were left hanging. David Glasgow Farragut frequented the tavern as a young student in 1817. The Delaware County Odd Fellows were organized there in 1831 and during the 1920s, the tavern became a speakeasy. The building was destroyed in 1949 and replaced by a gas station.

=== 20th Century-Present ===
In 1906, Aston was designated as a first class township. The current boundaries of Aston were established in 1945, when the northwestern portion of the township seceded to form the borough of Chester Heights.

A new veterans' memorial, dedicated to all veterans who lived in the township (and present-day Chester Heights prior to 1948) from the American Revolution to the present-day Operation Iraqi Freedom, along with Aston Township first responders killed in the line of duty, was built at the five-points intersection, opposite the site of the former 7 stars inn. An unveiling ceremony occurred on November 11, 2006, with the formal dedication ceremony on April 28, 2007. Endless Pools, a major manufacturer of electric swimming machines, is headquartered and manufactures in Aston Township.

== Geography ==
Aston Township is located in southwestern Delaware County, northwest of Chester Township and southwest of Media, the county seat. The borough of Chester Heights is along the northwestern border of the township. Chester Creek, a southeastward-flowing tributary of the Delaware River, forms the eastern border of the township. The township is bordered by the City of Chester to the south.

According to the United States Census Bureau, the township has a total area of 5.8 square miles (15.1 km^{2}), all land. The township is covered by two ZIP codes: 19014 (Aston Post Office, which also covers parts of Upper Chichester and Bethel townships), and 19063 (Media).

The township also contains the census-designated place of Village Green-Green Ridge.

== Demographics ==
Historical population
Census	Pop.	Note	%±
1930	2,659		—
1940	3,116		17.2%
1950	5,576		78.9%
1960	10,595		90.0%
1970	13,704		29.3%
1980	14,530		6.0%
1990	15,080		3.8%
2000	16,203		7.4%
2010	16,592		2.4%
2020	16,791		1.2%

As of 2010 census, the racial makeup of the township was 94.3% White, 2.8% African American, 0.1% Native American, 1.6% Asian, 0.3% from other races, and 0.9% from two or more races. Hispanic or Latino of any race were 1.6% of the population .

As of the 2000 census, of 2000, there were 16,203 people, 5,838 households, and 4,285 families residing in the township. The population density was 2,825.8 inhabitants per square mile (1,091.0/km^{2}). There were 5,978 housing units at an average density of 1,042.6 per square mile (402.6/km^{2}). The racial makeup of the township was 96.66% White, 1.48% African American, 0.03% Native American, 0.78% Asian, 0.02% Pacific Islander, 0.28% from other races, and 0.75% from two or more races. Hispanic or Latino of any race were 1.01% of the population.

There were 5,838 households, out of which 31.8% had children under the age of 18 living with them, 61.1% were married couples living together, 8.8% had a female householder with no husband present, and 26.6% were non-families. 22.8% of all households were made up of individuals, and 10.6% had someone living alone who was 65 years of age or older. The average household size was 2.66 and the average family size was 3.15.

In the township, the population was spread out, with 22.8% under the age of 18, 10.0% from 18 to 24, 28.1% from 25 to 44, 24.4% from 45 to 64, and 14.8% who were 65 years of age or older. The median age was 39 years. For every 100 females, there were 91.2 males. For every 100 females age 18 and over, there were 87.3 males.

The median income for a household in the township was $57,150, and the median income for a family was $64,938. Males had a median income of $45,585 versus $32,512 for females. The per capita income for the township was $23,206. About 2.5% of families and 4.7% of the population were below the poverty line, including 5.5% of those under age 18 and 9.2% of those age 65 or over.

== Transportation ==
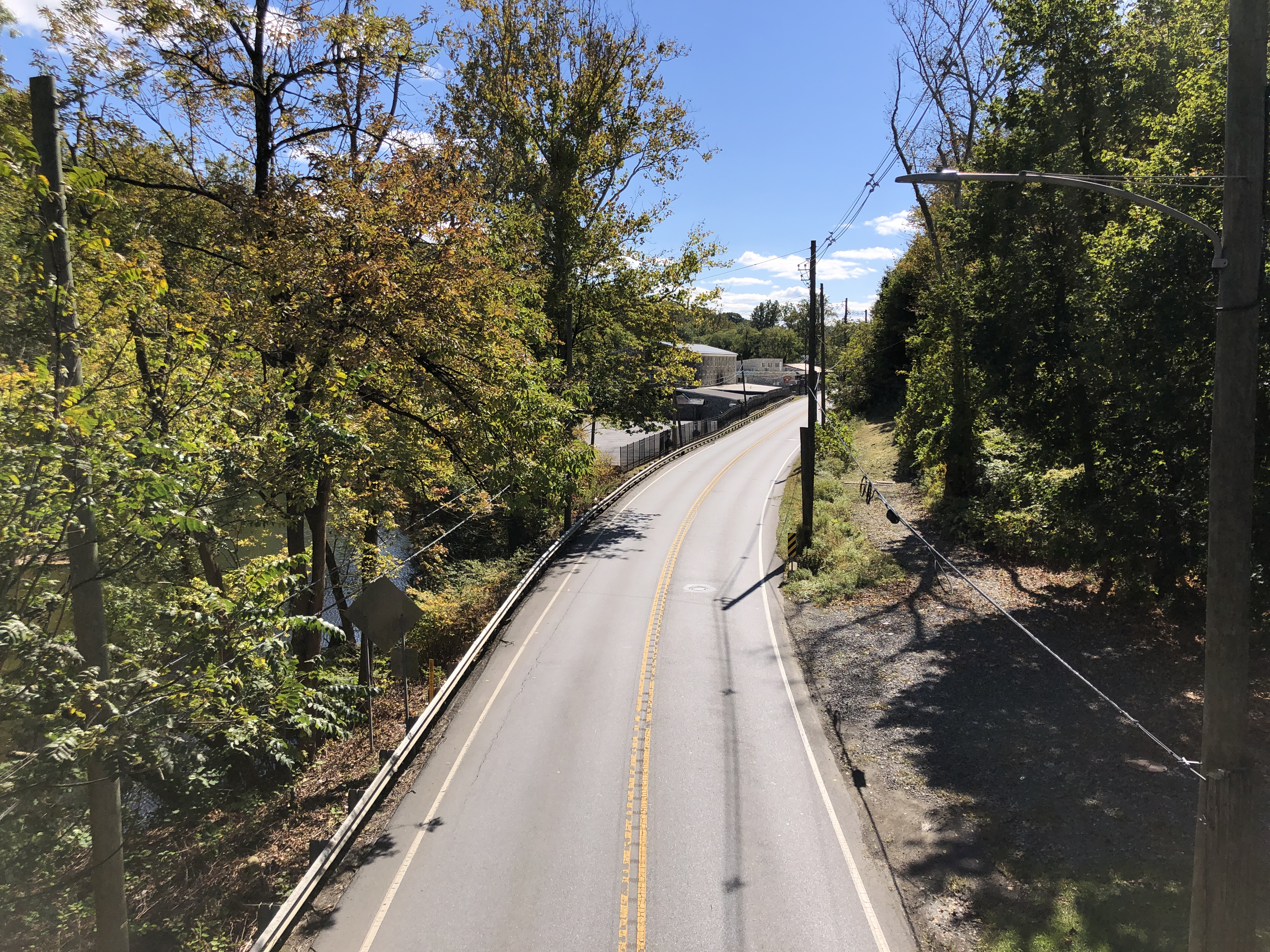
PA Route 452 south in Aston Township

As of 2021 there were 65.57 miles (105.52 km) of public roads in Aston Township, of which 12.00 miles (19.31 km) were maintained by the Pennsylvania Department of Transportation (PennDOT) and 53.57 miles (86.21 km) were maintained by the township.

Pennsylvania Route 452 is the only numbered highway traversing Aston Township; it follows a north-south alignment via Pennell Road through the heart of the township.

== Education ==
Aston Township is a part of the Penn-Delco School District. There are two elementary schools located in the township, Aston Elementary and Pennell Elementary. There is one middle school, Northley Middle. The high school in this district is Sun Valley High School, home of the Vanguards. Aston is also the home of Neumann University, a small Catholic-affiliated liberal arts institution.

Holy Family Regional Catholic School in Aston is the area Catholic school. It formed in 2012 from a merger of St. Joseph Catholic School in Aston and Holy Savior-St. John Fisher Elementary School in Linwood. St. Joseph opened in 1951 with the church basement being the first school location. The dedicated school building opened with a single floor in 1955 and a second floor added in 1959; the first floor had eight classrooms. The building received two additional classrooms and a 1987 addition.

== Sports ==
The Philadelphia Little Flyers are a USA Hockey-sanctioned Tier III junior ice hockey team from Aston. They play in the South Conference of the Eastern Hockey League (EHL) IceWorks Skating Complex

The Aston Rebels of the North American Hockey League played their home games at the IceWorks Skating Complex from 2015 to 2017.

During the early 1970s, the Aston (Green) Knights played minor league professional football in the Seaboard Football League. Vince Papale and Joe Klecko were among the players that played for the Green Knights.

The Aston Bulls rugby league team played in the American National Rugby League from 1998 to 2013. They played their home games at Sun Valley High School from 2006 to 2013, after relocating from Glen Mills.

== Notable people ==
- Ben Agosto, Olympic figure skater
- Isaac D. Barnard, former U.S. Senator
- Tanith Belbin, Olympic figure skater
- Asher Blinkoff, actor, voice actor
- Leah Cevoli, actor
- Ben Davis, professional baseball player, San Diego Padres and Seattle Mariners
- Gennadi Karponosov, ice dancing coach and former competitor
- Adam Pecorari, American road racer
- Robbie Pecorari, American road racer
- Samuel Riddle, textile manufacturer
