= Mike Picciotti =

American boxer

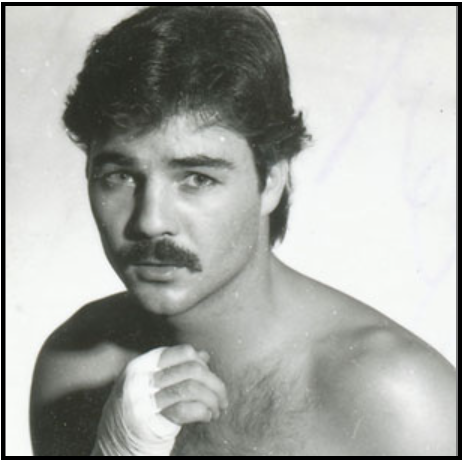

Mike Francis Picciotti (May 17, 1957 – November 5, 2023), often known by the nickname, "Pic", was an American professional boxer who competed in 38 pro fights from 1976 to 1986. He was ranked 10th in the world as a middleweight and one fight away from a world title shot. Pic was featured in an article of The Ring, where he was interviewed about his career and the current state of boxing. He was known for his aggressive pressure style and heavy body attack. Picciotti fought his main bouts in Atlantic City, the Spectrum, and the 69th Street Forum.

== Early life ==
Mike Picciotti, the youngest of five children of Peggy and Evandro Picciotti, was born in Southwest Philadelphia, Pennsylvania. The family moved to the Folsom section of Ridley Township, PA when he was 10 years old. His father worked at the Philadelphia Navy Yard and his mother was a hairdresser. He attended Ridley High School, graduating in 1976.

In his youth, Picciotti was outgoing and sociable. As a student he struggled with written instructions, but excelled with verbal learning. This ability to hear instructions and immediately implement would serve him well in sports. Pic had a reputation as a nice kid, who could really fight, and would often stand up to bullies. Mike played football and loved dogs. He would often rescue dogs from the SPCA.

== Career ==
Pic started boxing as a teenager in the backyard of his neighbor Joe Sloan's house in Ridley Township. They would let the grass grow high, then cut the shape of a boxing ring with a lawn mower. Sloan would eventually bring Pic and his friends Micky Diflo (Mick) and Victor Papa (Vic) to Upper Darby gym to box. A trainer named Marty Feldman noticed Pic and his friends' natural abilities and began working with them. After a year under Feldman's tutelage, Pic won the 1976 Philadelphia Golden Gloves as a lightweight. Mick and Pic also went to Bermuda twice, representing U.S. boxers, to face off against international competition in the Bermuda Amateur Boxing Association. Soon after, the trio of Mick, Vic, and Pic would turn pro under Peltz Boxing Promotions.

Trainer Marty Feldman believed in full hard sparring. During camps at Upper Darby gym, the hard sparring sessions became legendary. Often, other fighters in the gym would literally stop what they were doing to watch the highly competitive sessions. Marty's other top Philly middleweights Frank "the Animal" Fletcher and his brother Anthony Fletcher would also participate, drawing in big crowds.

Thanks to his great training partners Pic's pro career started with a 15-bout unbeaten streak (14-0-1) and went 25-2-3 in his first thirty fights. During his 10-year boxing career, Pic had 2 layoffs due to a car accident and an eye injury.

The car accident happened in 1979 on McDade boulevard in Ridley. The vehicle went through 2 telephone poles before being stopped by the third. He sustained a back injury, which temporarily removed him from boxing. A year later Pic returned to the ring, and would go on 2-year winning streak, until his third matchup against Philly's Johnny Cooper. An unmotivated and out of shape Pic would suffer a unanimous decision loss to Cooper, and a broken orbital bone. He would take almost 2 years off focusing on his family and his personal health.

Pic found his motivation in 1984 and began training once again with Marty Feldman. In his final comeback he would go on another win streak, all by way of knockout. Pic would drop his last 2 fights in 1986 before retiring with a record of 31-4-3.

== Achievements ==
- 1976 Philadelphia Golden Gloves Lightweight Champion
- 1997 Delaware County Athletes Hall of Fame Inductee
- 2003 Ridley Township Old Timers Hall of Fame Inductee
- 2014 Pennsylvania Boxing Hall of Fame Inductee

== Death ==
Mike Picciotti died November 5, 2023.
