= Ethan Pecko =

American baseball player (born 2002)

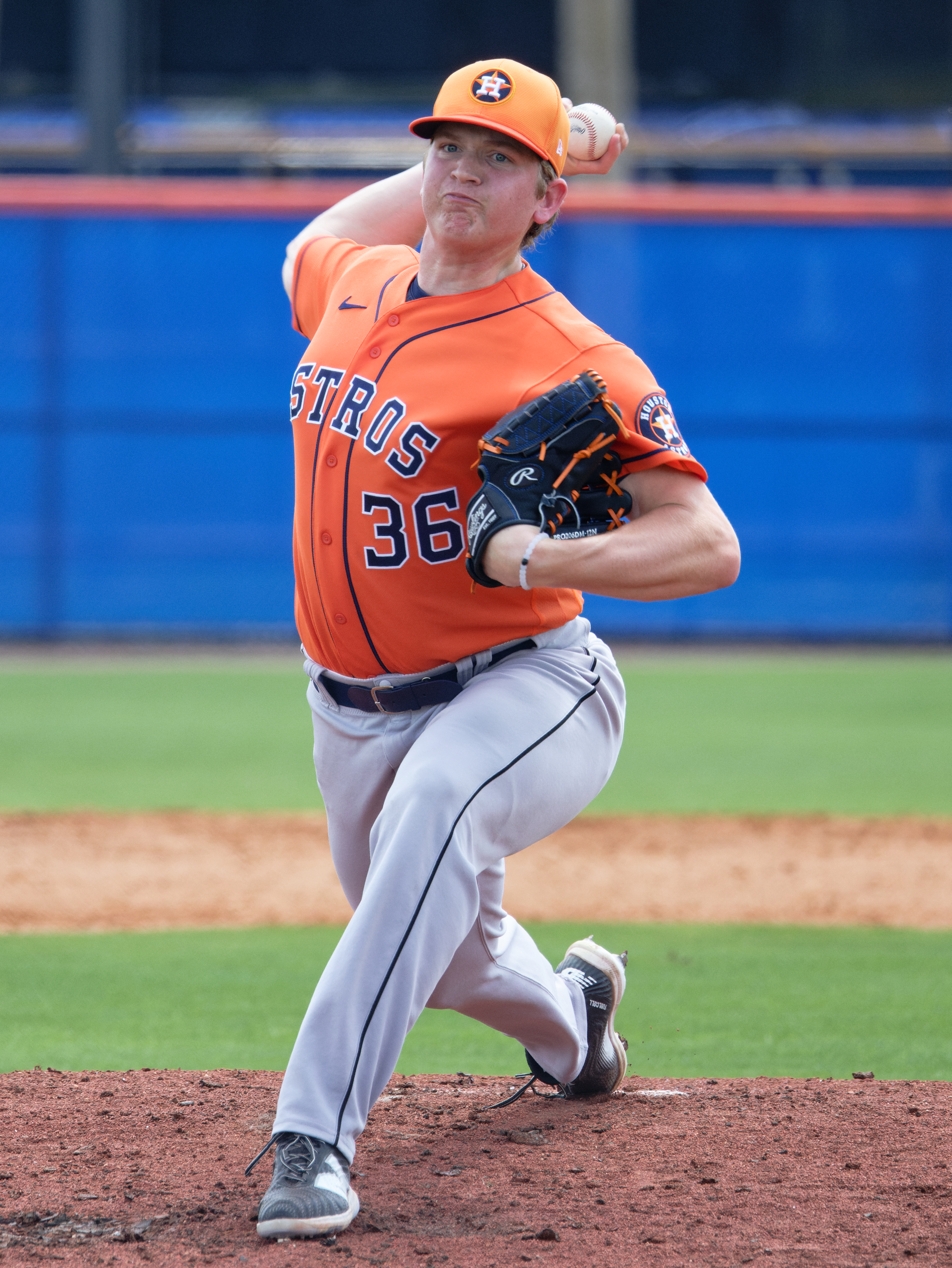
- Pecko with the Houston Astros during spring training in 2024

Houston Astros – No. 70
- Pitcher
- Born: August 25, 2002 (age 24); Darby, Pennsylvania, U.S.
- Bats: Right Throws: Right

MLB debut
- August 19, 2026, for the Houston Astros

MLB statistics (through 2026 season)
- Win–loss record: 2–0
- Earned run average: 3.93
- Strikeouts: 23
- Stats at Baseball Reference

Teams
- Houston Astros (2026–present)

Ethan John Pecko (born August 25, 2002) is an American professional baseball pitcher for the Houston Astros of Major League Baseball (MLB). He debuted in MLB in 2026.

== Amateur career ==
Pecko grew up in Ridley Park, Pennsylvania and attended Ridley High School in Folsom, Pennsylvania. After graduating in 2020, he enrolled at La Salle University but missed his freshman year in 2021 after undergoing UCL surgery. La Salle eliminated baseball following the 2021 season, and Pecko transferred to Towson University. As a redshirt sophomore in 2023, he went 2–2 with a 3.21 ERA and 48 strikeouts. After the season, he played collegiate summer baseball in the Northwoods League with the Wausau Woodchucks.

== Professional career ==
The Houston Astros selected Pecko in the sixth round of the 2023 Major League Baseball draft. Pecko made his professional debut in 2023 with the Florida Complex League Astros and also spent time with the Fayetteville Woodpeckers. Over 15 innings, he posted a 6.60 ERA. Pecko was assigned to Fayetteville to open 2024 and was promoted to the Asheville Tourists and Corpus Christi Hooks during the season. Over 26 games (15 starts) between the three teams, Pecko went 4–6 with a 3.47 ERA and 125 strikeouts over 96 innings and was named the Astros Minor League Pitcher of the Year.

The Astros assigned Pecko to Corpus Christi to open the 2025 season, although he missed time due to injury and completed a rehab assignment with the Complex League Astros. Over 11 games with Corpus Christi, Pecko posted a 4.40 ERA and 45 strikeouts. In early August, he was promoted to the Sugar Land Space Cowboys. Over eight games with Sugar Land to end the season, Pecko went 1–4 with a 3.09 ERA and 48 strikeouts over 35 innings. Pecko opened the 2026 season on the injured list with thoracic outlet syndrome and underwent surgery. He made three rehab appearances with Fayetteville and was then assigned to Sugar Land. At the time of his promotion to the major leagues, he had pitched in 17 games for Sugar Land and had a 4–6 record, a 4.94 ERA and 71 strikeouts across 74 2/3 innings.

On August 19, 2026, the Astros promoted Pecko to the major leagues for the first time. He made his MLB debut that night as Houston's starting pitcher against the Los Angeles Angels and pitched 3 2/3 innings in which he allowed two runs on three hits and three walks in a 3–2 Astros victory. Pecko also recorded four strikeouts, the first of his MLB career being of Vaughn Grissom. He recorded his first career MLB win on August 30 against the New York Mets after pitching five innings in which he gave up two earned runs, three hits, and two walks in a 6–3 Astros win. Pecko pitched in eight games (five starts) for the Astros and ended the season with a 2–0 record, a 3.93 ERA and 23 strikeouts across 34 1/3 innings.
