= Pennsylvania House of Representatives, District 162 =

American legislative district

Pennsylvania's 162nd State House of Representatives district
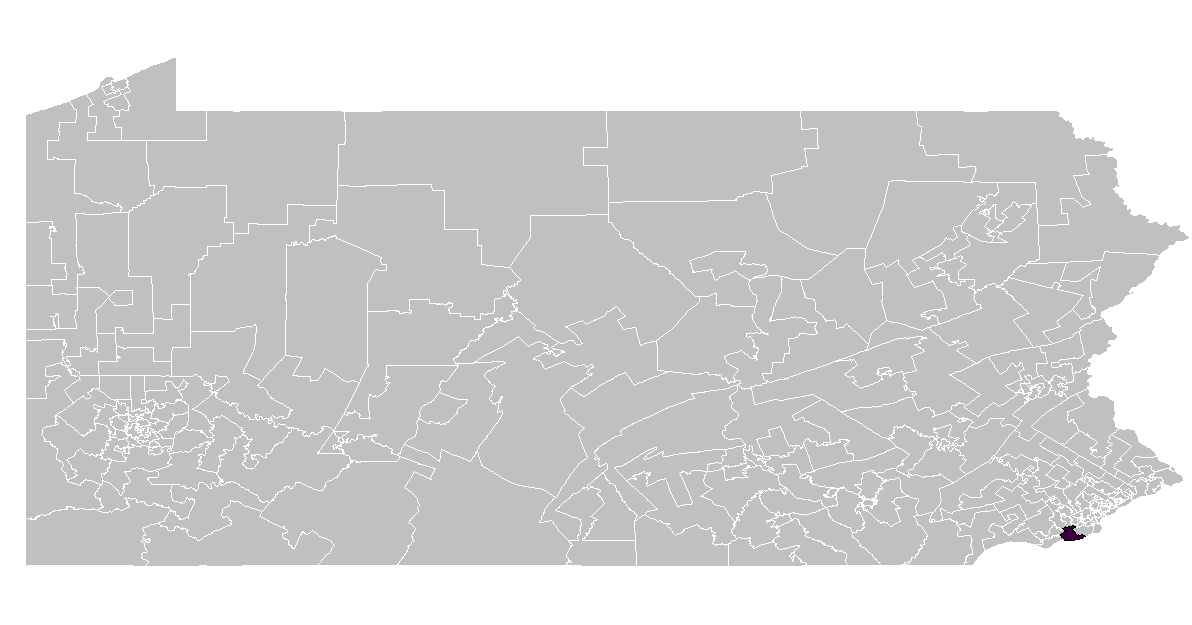
Representative
David Delloso; D–Ridley Township
- Population (2021): 64,947

Pennsylvania House of Representatives District 162 includes part of Delaware County. It is currently represented by Democrat David Delloso.

== District profile ==
The district includes the following areas:

Delaware County:

- Darby Township (PART)
  - Ward 01
  - Ward 02
- Folcroft
- Glenolden
- Norwood
- Prospect Park
- Ridley Park
- Ridley Township (PART)
  - Ward 01 [PART, Division 02]
  - Ward 03
  - Ward 04
  - Ward 05 [PART, Division 02]
  - Ward 06
  - Ward 08
  - Ward 09
- Rutledge
- Sharon Hill

== Representatives ==
Representative	Party	Years	District home	Note
Prior to 1969, seats were apportioned by county.
Joseph W. Dorsey	Republican	1969 – 1974		
Patrick B. Gillespie	Democrat	1975 – 1978		
Gerald J. Spitz	Republican	1979 – 1984		
Ronald C. Raymond	Republican	1985 – 2008	Ridley Park	
Nicholas Miccarelli III	Republican	2009-2018	Ridley Park	
David Delloso	Democrat	2019 – present	Ridley	

== Recent election results ==
2022 election
Party	Candidate	Votes	%
Democratic	David Delloso (incumbent)	15,023	58.6
Republican	Michelle Mattus	10,595	41.4
Total votes		25,618	100.0
Democratic hold			

2020 election
Party	Candidate	Votes	%
Democratic	David Delloso (incumbent)	18,693	54.3
Republican	Pete Gaglio	15,731	45.7
Total votes		34,424	100.0
Democratic hold			

2018 election
Party	Candidate	Votes	%
Democratic	David Delloso	13,073	51.6
Republican	Mary Hopper	12,278	48.4
Total votes		25,351	100.0
Democratic gain from Republican			

2016 election
Party	Candidate	Votes	%
Republican	Nicholas Miccarelli III (incumbent)	19,883	63.9
Democratic	James Butt	11,225	36.1
Total votes		31,108	100.0
Republican hold			

2014 election
Party	Candidate	Votes	%
Republican	Nicholas Miccarelli III (incumbent)	17,902	100.00
Total votes		17,902	100.0
Republican hold			

2012 election
Party	Candidate	Votes	%
Republican	Nicholas Miccarelli III (incumbent)	25,447	100.00
Total votes		25,447	100.0
Republican hold			

2010 election
Party	Candidate	Votes	%
Republican	Nicholas Miccarelli III (incumbent)	11,822	63.8
Democratic	Scott Macneil	6,704	36.2
Total votes		18,526	100.0
Republican hold			
