= Batten University =

Private university in Virginia Beach, Virginia, US

- Former names: Virginia Wesleyan College (1961–2017); Virginia Wesleyan University (2017–2026)
- Motto: Sapientia Illuminat Viam
- Motto in English: Wisdom lights the way
- Type: Private
- Established: 1961; 65 years ago
- Religious affiliation: United Methodist Church
- Academic affiliations: CIC; CUMU; NAICU; VFIC
- Endowment: $123.5 million (2021)
- President: Scott D. Miller
- Students: 1,676 (Main Campus), 355 LUJ/VWU Global (Japan), 2,601 VWU Global Campus (Online and Continuing Education)
- Location: Virginia Beach, Virginia, United States; 36°52′4.8″N 76°11′15.4″W
- Campus: Urban, 300 acres (1.21 km^{2})
- Colors: Dark Blue, Grey/Silver, and Coastal Blue
- Nickname: Marlins
- Sporting affiliations: NCAA Division III – ODAC
- Mascot: Bob Marlin
- Website: batten.edu

Batten University (formerly Virginia Wesleyan University) is a private university in Virginia Beach, Virginia, United States. The university is nonsectarian but historically affiliated with The United Methodist Church. It enrolls 4,632 learners in all locations: 1,676 students annually in undergraduate and graduate programs, 2,601 in VWU Global Campus (online and continuing education), and 355 students at LUJ/VWU Global (Japan). Virginia Wesleyan transitioned from a college to a university in 2017.

The Batten University campus is also home to the Chesapeake Bay Academy, an educational institution that educates and guides students with learning disabilities, and the Tidewater Collegiate Academy, a teaching laboratory that extends from the primary grades through high school.

Batten collaborates with Virginia Beach Economic Development for a work development center, The Hive, in Virginia Beach. In 2025, the university opened VWU-Chesapeake, a comprehensive program for those incarcerated at St. Brides Correctional Center and Indian Creek Correctional Center.

== History ==
The school was chartered in 1961 as Virginia Wesleyan College under the initiative of Methodist minister Joseph Shackford Johnston, later the college's first president. It became a university in 2017. In 2026, the university's name was changed to Batten University to honor the substantial long-term financial support from Jane Batten, the wife of Frank Batten, and the Batten family.

Presidents of Wesleyan
Name	Tenure
Scott Douglas Miller	2015–present
William Thomas Greer Jr.	1992–2015
Lambuth McGeehee Clarke	1966–1992
Joseph Shackford Johnston	1965

== Academics ==
=== Colleges and schools ===
Batten University consists of four schools devoted to specific areas of study: the Susan S. Goode School of Arts and Humanities, the Joan P. Brock School of Mathematics and Natural Sciences, Birdsong School of Social Science, and the D. Henry Watts School of Professional Studies.

=== Batten Honors College ===
The Jane P. Batten Honors College, named for Trustee Emerita Jane Batten and her late husband Frank Batten, Sr., was founded in 2017 with a mission to "inspire, engage, and prepare academically talented students to become leaders, environmental stewards, and impactful citizens in the global community."

=== Batten Global Campus ===
Founded in 2017, Batten Global Campus supports students in early enrollment, evening and weekend, online (undergraduate, graduate, and non-credit) and at LUJ/VWU Global (Japan). Batten Global Campus operates all for-credit programs outside of the traditional undergraduate program, the campus in Japan, and also supports non-credit, continuing-education offerings. In 2024, Lakeland University (WI) and Batten University announced the joint establishment of the Jane P. Batten and David R. Black School for International Studies.

=== Batten University/Westminster Lifelong Learning Institute ===
The Batten University/Westminster Lifelong Learning Institute, a component of Batten Global Campus, was launched in 2017. Several courses are taught during each of two regular sessions, and roughly half will be on faith-related topics. The University offers a wide variety of courses throughout the year for the residents of the Westminster-Canterbury on the Chesapeake Bay campus

== Campus ==
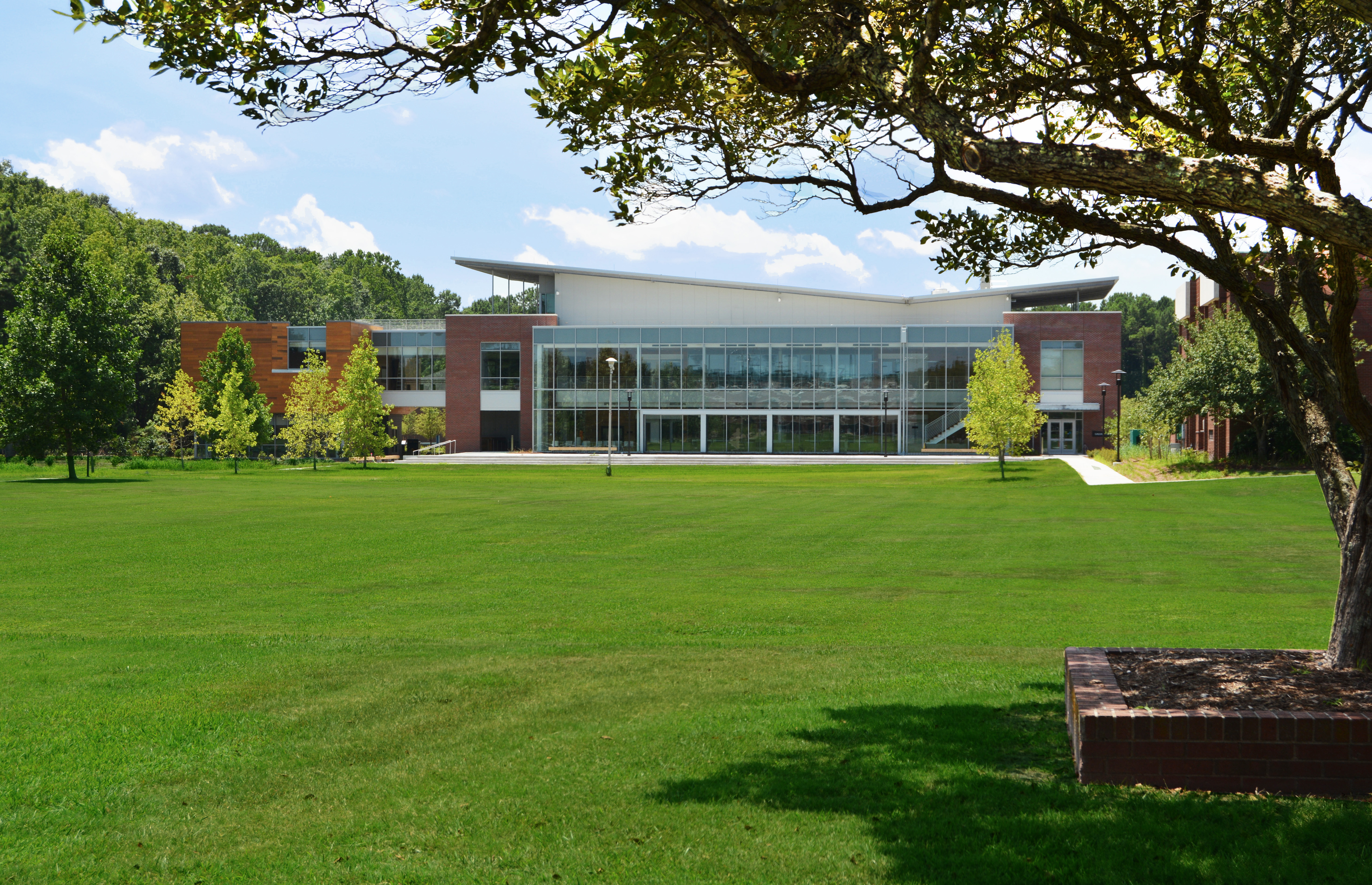
The Greer Environmental Sciences Center at Batten University

Situated on 300 acres (1.2 km^{2}) in Virginia Beach, the university is separated into five villages. Bray Village (Village I) and Allen Village (Village II) offer combined living-learning environments built on the Jeffersonian model, with multi-purpose buildings. Brock Village (Village III) and Honors Village (Village IV) are solely housing units. Coastal 61 was added as a fifth village in 2020.

The Robert "Bobby" T. Williams Trail, leading from the Blocker Youth Center to Lake Taylor, was dedicated in October 2019 in memory of the 1975 graduate who was killed in the Virginia Beach Municipal Center shooting in May 2019.

The Greer Environmental Sciences Center, dedicated in 2017, is a state-of-the-art center for teaching and research. The 18-acre Wilson Arboretum was established in 1995 in memory of William M. Wilson, dean of the university from 1971 to 1994. Since 1997, retiring faculty members have chosen a tree to be planted within the arboretum to honor their service to the institution

The 12-acre (4.9 ha) Beech Forest, a rare example of an old-growth stand of beech trees, was designated a Natural Heritage Resource by the Commonwealth of Virginia in 1992. The campus features over 13 miles of biking and hiking paths and trails. In July 2023, Batten University and the Virginia Museum of Contemporary Art announced their collaboration on the construction of a $25 million facility to be built on the university's Virginia Beach campus. The groundbreaking ceremony took place in August 2024, celebrating the facility’s donors: Jane Batten, Joan Brock, and Susan and David Goode. The Museum opened in April of 2026.

== Athletics ==
Batten University Marlins Athletics Logo

Batten University sports teams are known as the Marlins. The university participates in the Old Dominion Athletic Conference (ODAC) and is a member of the National Collegiate Athletic Association (NCAA) Division III. Batten also has a supplemental conference membership with the Eastern Collegiate Athletic Conference (ECAC).

== Notable alumni ==
- Kelly Convirs-Fowler, politician
- Kevin Nickelberry, college basketball coach
- Randy Peele, college basketball coach
- Sam Presti, professional basketball executive
- Richard H. Stuart, politician
- Keller Williams, musician
