= Patrick Gillespie =

Patrick Gillespie may refer to:

- Patrick Gillespie (minister)
- Patrick Gillespie (baseball)
- Patrick B. Gillespie, member of the Pennsylvania House of Representatives
