= William Greer (disambiguation) =

William Greer may refer to:

- William Greer (1909-1985), US Secret Service agent, driver for John F. Kennedy
- William Greer (bishop) (1902-1972), Anglican bishop
- William C. Greer (died 1972), Maryland politician
- William Thomas Greer Jr. (1942-2023), college president
