= Woodlyn, Pennsylvania =

Unincorporated community in Pennsylvania, US

- Census-designated place
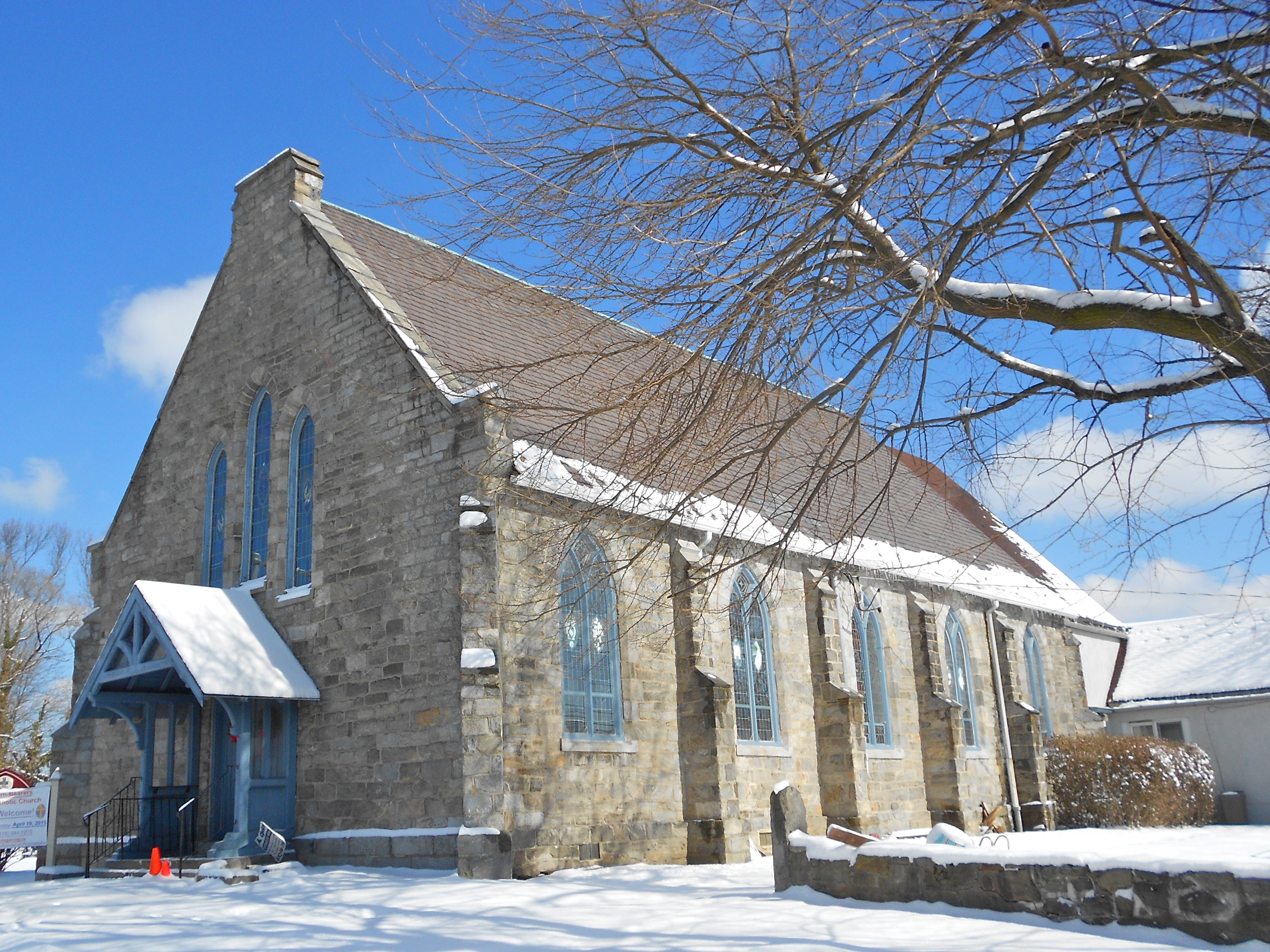
- Leiper Presbyterian Church

- Location in Delaware County and the U.S. state of Pennsylvania
- Coordinates: 39°52′40″N 75°20′32″W
- Country: United States
- State: Pennsylvania
- County: Delaware
- Township: Ridley

Area
  - Total: 1.7 sq mi (4.4 km^{2})
  - Land: 1.7 sq mi (4.4 km^{2})
  - Water: 0.0 sq mi (0 km^{2})
- Elevation: 112 ft (34 m)

Population (2010)
  - Total: 9,485
  - Density: 5,600/sq mi (2,200/km^{2})
- Time zone: UTC-5 (EST)
  - Summer (DST): UTC-4 (EDT)
- ZIP code: 19094
- Area codes: 610 and 484
- FIPS code: 42-86288
- GNIS feature ID: 2390534

Woodlyn is a census-designated place (CDP) in Delaware County, Pennsylvania, United States. The population was 9,485 at the 2010 census, down from 10,036 at the 2000 census. It is a part of Ridley Township, and children residing within the community generally attend schools in the Ridley School District. Woodlyn is served by the Woodlyn Fire Co. for fire, rescue and EMS services.

== Geography ==
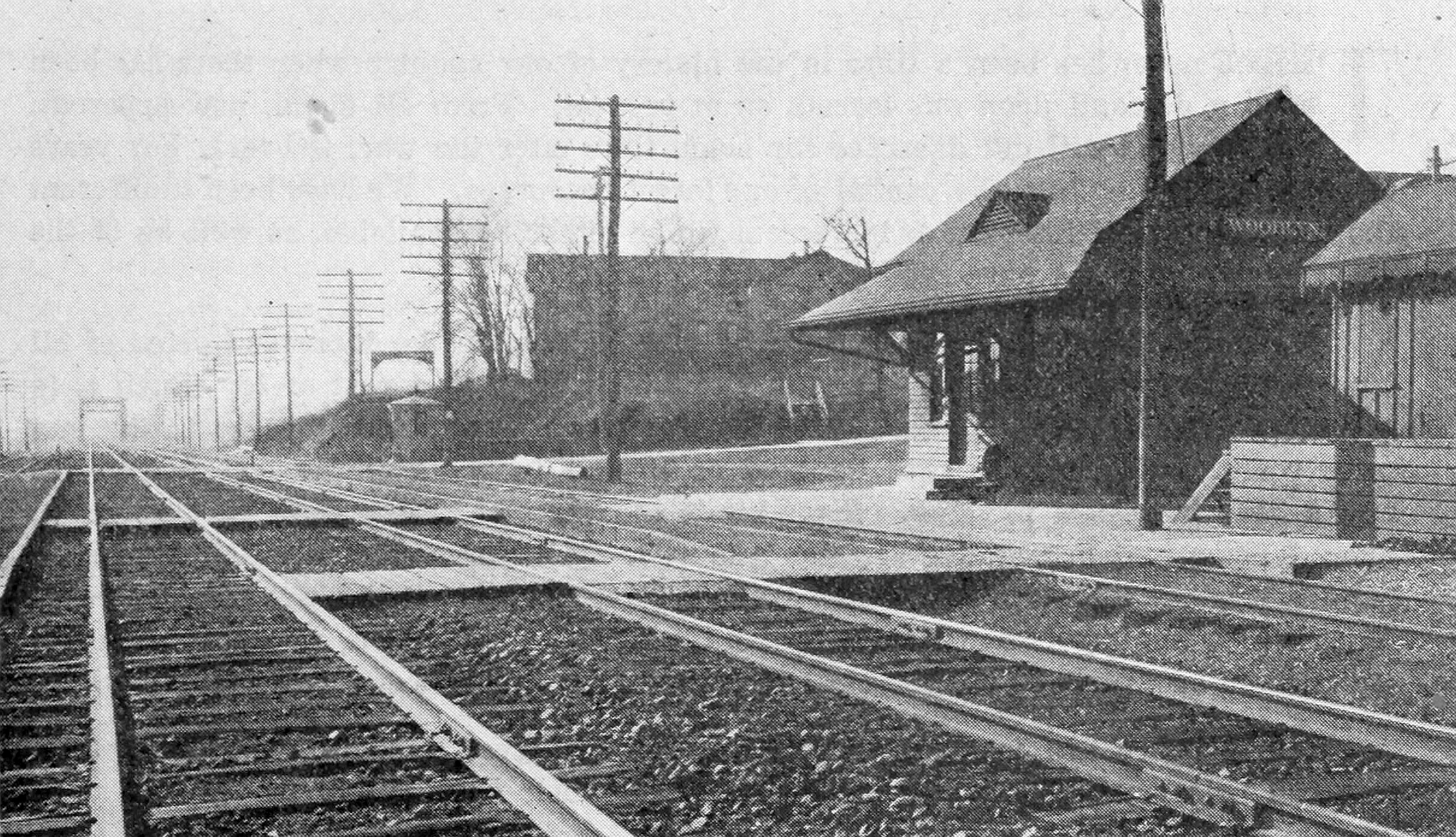
Baltimore and Ohio Railroad station in Woodlyn, 1912

Woodlyn is located in the western part of Ridley Township. It is bordered to the northeast by the Folsom part of Ridley Township, to the east by the borough of Ridley Park, to the south by the borough of Eddystone, to the southwest by the city of Chester, to the west by Nether Providence Township, and to the north by Springfield Township and the borough of Swarthmore. Interstate 476 (the Blue Route) and Interstate 95 intersect in the southern part of Woodlyn. Center City, Philadelphia, is 14 miles (23 km) to the northeast via I-95.

According to the United States Census Bureau, the Woodlyn CDP has a total area of 1.7 square miles (4.3 km^{2}), all land.

== Demographics ==
Historical population
Census	Pop.	Note	%±
2000	10,036		—
2010	9,485		−5.5%
2020	9,685		2.1%

At the 2000 census there were 10,036 people, 3,960 households, and 2,637 families in the CDP. The population density was 6,100.8 inhabitants per square mile (2,355.5/km^{2}). There were 4,132 housing units at an average density of 2,511.8 per square mile (969.8/km^{2}). The racial makeup of the CDP was 87.88% White, 9.15% African American, 0.15% Native American, 1.18% Asian, 0.07% Pacific Islander, 0.34% from other races, and 1.24% from two or more races. Hispanic or Latino of any race were 1.38%.

There were 3,960 households, 30.9% had children under the age of 18 living with them, 48.4% were married couples living together, 14.0% had a female householder with no husband present, and 33.4% were non-families. 28.9% of households were made up of individuals, and 13.5% were one person aged 65 or older. The average household size was 2.53 and the average family size was 3.16.

The age distribution was 25.6% under the age of 18, 7.4% from 18 to 24, 29.8% from 25 to 44, 20.4% from 45 to 64, and 16.8% 65 or older. The median age was 38 years. For every 100 females, there were 92.1 males. For every 100 females age 18 and over, there were 86.3 males.

The median household income was $42,639 and the median family income was $49,590. Males had a median income of $40,066 versus $28,163 for females. The per capita income for the CDP was $20,899. About 8.9% of families and 11.8% of the population were below the poverty line, including 17.4% of those under age 18 and 12.5% of those age 65 or over.

== Education ==
The school district is the Ridley School District.

== Notable people ==
- Rocco J. Carzo, football coach
- George Trosley, cartoonist
