= WRSD =

Radio station at Ridley High School in Folsom, Pennsylvania

Coordinates: 39.8868°N 75.3332°W

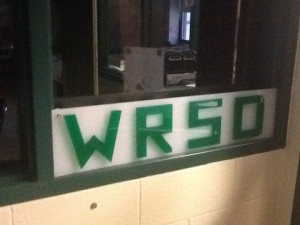
- Folsom, Pennsylvania; United States
- Broadcast area: Philadelphia
- Frequency: 94.9 MHz

Programming
- Format: High school radio

Ownership
- Owner: Ridley School District

Technical information
- Facility ID: 56368
- Class: D
- ERP: 14 watts
- HAAT: 6 meters

WRSD, known as "Ridley School District Radio", is a variety radio station which is broadcast in the Philadelphia area. The station is broadcast locally from a transmitter located in Folsom, Pennsylvania, and covers a fairly large radius around the Folsom, Pennsylvania area. WRSD features a variety of programming, which is done during the school year by students of Ridley High School.

== Student broadcasts ==
WRSD is a student-run radio station. Every year, students broadcast several shows a day. The radio station broadcasts a variety of music throughout the course of the year, representing many different genres. Each show has two to three students. Students can earn credit to become a member of the National Honor Society by joining the radio station.

== Sporting events ==
Ridley High School sporting events are also broadcast throughout the year. All Green Raider football games are broadcast, as well as select basketball games. Also, the annual rivalry game between Ridley High School and Interboro High School that is played on Thanksgiving Day is broadcast on the station.
