= Ronald C. Raymond =

American politician

Member of the Pennsylvania House of Representatives from the 162nd district
- In office 1985 – November 30, 2008
- Preceded by: Gerald J. Spitz
- Succeeded by: Nick Miccarelli

Personal details
- Born: May 10, 1951 (age 75) Chester, Pennsylvania
- Party: Republican
- Children: 2 children

Ronald C. Raymond (born May 10, 1951) is an American politician from Pennsylvania who served as a Republican member of the Pennsylvania House of Representatives for the 162nd district from 1985 through 2008.

== Early life and education ==
Raymond was born in Chester, Pennsylvania. He graduated from Sharon Hill High School in 1969 and attended Widener University.

== Career ==
Raymond worked as a real estate agent and was elected to the Folcroft Borough council in 1976. He was elected to the Sharon Hill council and served from 1978 to 1981. He was elected to the Pennsylvania House of Representatives for the 162nd district and served from 1985 to 2008. He was not a candidate for reelection in 2008.

== Personal life ==
He and his wife live in Ridley Park, Pennsylvania and have 2 children.
