= Bob Kuberski =

American football player (born 1971)

No. 94, 93
- Position: Defensive tackle

Personal information
- Born: April 5, 1971 (age 55); Chester, Pennsylvania, U.S.
- Listed height: 6 ft 4 in (1.93 m)
- Listed weight: 298 lb (135 kg)

Career information
- High school: Ridley (Folsom, Pennsylvania)
- College: Navy
- NFL draft: 1993: 7th round, 183rd overall pick

Career history
- Green Bay Packers (1993–1998); Atlanta Falcons (1999)*; New England Patriots (1999); Denver Broncos (2000)*
- * Offseason or practice squad member only

Awards and highlights
- Super Bowl champion (XXXI); First-team All-East (1991)

Career NFL statistics
- Games played: 54
- Sacks: 2
- Stats at Pro Football Reference

Robert Kenneth Kuberski Jr. (born April 5, 1971) is an American former professional football player who was a defensive tackle in the National Football League (NFL) for the Green Bay Packers and the New England Patriots. He played college football for the Navy Midshipmen.

== Biography ==
Kuberski graduated from Ridley High School in 1989 and attended the United States Naval Academy (Navy), where he was a three-year letter winner and a two-time all-East selection.

Kuberski was selected by the Packers in the seventh round (183rd overall) of the 1993 NFL draft. He served on active duty as an ensign in the United States Navy for two years prior to the beginning of his NFL career.

He played in Green Bay for four seasons from 1995 to 1998, seeing action in forty-nine games in which he also served as Green Bay's representative to the NFL Players Association for 1996–1998. In 1999, he signed with the New England Patriots, closed out his career playing in five games. Kuberski had two career sacks.

In 2009, he was selected to the Navy Marine Corps Memorial All-Stadium Defensive Line. A member of the Navy Sports Hall of Fame, he was inducted into the Pennsylvania Sports Hall of Fame in 2016. He remains active in the Naval Academy community via his involvement as a trustee of the United States Naval Academy Foundation and serves as president of the Class of 1993.

Kuberski got his start in financial services as an off-season intern at Associated Investments following his rookie year in Green Bay. He then spent ten years as a regional vice president at Invesco after working as a financial advisor at Morgan Stanley. The head of global relationship management at Eaton Vance (Morgan Stanley) and then of retail sales at RidgeWorth Investments (Virtus), he subsequently became the head of Wealth Management Consulting Group at Cohen & Steers.
