= Swarthmorewood, Pennsylvania =

Swarthmorewood
- Neighborhood
- Interactive map of Swarthmorewood
- Coordinates: 39°53′.6″N 75°20′58.7″W
- Country: United States
- State: Pennsylvania
- County: Delaware County
- City: Swarthmore and Ridley Township

Swarthmorewood is a neighborhood in Delaware County, Pennsylvania, United States. Swarthmorewood is different from Swarthmore because, while residents have a Swarthmore mailing address, their taxes go to Ridley Township and are considered part of the Ridley School District. The neighborhood sits on the border of Springfield and Swarthmore townships. It is also bordered by the Woodlyn, Wallingford, and Grace Park neighborhoods. The terrains was woods and farmland before being developed in the 1950s. A large number of second generation home owners is part of what makes the neighborhood desirable. Public transportation, shopping and education are within walking distance. There is an active Athletic association renowned for feeding the local high school sports programs.
