= Brett Moyer =

American lacrosse player

Personal information
- Nationality: American
- Born: January 1, 1984 (age 42) Ridley Park, Pennsylvania, U.S.
- Height: 6 ft 0 in (183 cm)
- Weight: 180 lb (82 kg; 12 st 12 lb)

Sport
- Position: Defense
- NLL teams: Philadelphia Wings
- MLL teams: Philadelphia Barrage
- Former NCAA team: Hofstra University
- Pro career: 2006–2008

Brett Moyer (born January 1, 1984) is an American retired professional lacrosse player who played for the Philadelphia Wings in the National Lacrosse League, and the Philadelphia Barrage in the Major League Lacrosse. Moyer was a three-time All American at Hofstra University. Moyer is currently the head varsity lacrosse coach at IMG Academy.

== Early life ==
Moyer attended Ridley High School in Pennsylvania where he was teammates with Bill McGlone and became an All-American. The pair won two straight Pennsylvania state titles and were both Offensive and Defensive MVPs two years in a row respectively. Moyer also played quarterback on the football team and small forward on the basketball team.

== Collegiate career ==
Moyer attended Hofstra University where he was a starter for four years, and a three-time All-American. While at Hofsta, he was named CAA Defender of the Year twice (in 2005 and 2006). In 2006, as a senior, he was First-Team All-American, and appeared in the 2006 USILA North-South Senior All-Star Game, where he was named the game's Most Valuable Player. With Moyer anchoring a defense which gave up less than 7 goals a game in 2006, Hofstra won 17 games in a row, reached #2 in the national polls and reached the quarterfinals of the NCAA tournament.

Moyer was also a member of the 2003 U.S. Men's Under-19 Team International Lacrosse Federation World Champions.

== Professional career ==
After being acquired in a trade prior to the 2006 season, Moyer was part of a defensive unit that helped the Philadelphia Barrage win the MLL championship in 2006, and 2007.

The Philadelphia Wings acquired Moyer as a free agent prior to the 2008 NLL season

== Acting career ==
Moyer acted in all the major lacrosse scenes in A Warrior's Heart in 2011.

== Coaching career ==
Moyer coached the Merchant Marine Mariners for several years before joining IMG Academy in 2021.

== Statistics ==
=== MLL ===
| | | Regular Season | | | | | | | Playoffs |
| Season | Team | GP | G | 2ptG | A | Pts | GB | PIM | GP | G | 2ptG | A | Pts | GB | PIM |
|---|---|---|---|---|---|---|---|---|---|---|---|---|---|---|---|
| 2006 | Philadelphia | 5 | 1 | 0 | 0 | 1 | 5 | 0 | 2 | 0 | 0 | 0 | 0 | 0 | 0 |
| 2007 | Philadelphia | 12 | 0 | 0 | 0 | 0 | 14 | 1 | 2 | 0 | 0 | 0 | 0 | 4 | 0 |
| 2008 | Barrage | 12 | 0 | 0 | 0 | 0 | 20 | 5.5 | 1 | 0 | 0 | 0 | 0 | 1 | 0 |
| MLL Totals | | 29 | 1 | 0 | 0 | 1 | 0 | 6.5 | 5 | 0 | 0 | 0 | 0 | 5 | 0 |

=== NLL ===
| | | Regular Season | | | | | | Playoffs |
| Season | Team | GP | G | A | Pts | LB | PIM | GP | G | A | Pts | LB | PIM |
|---|---|---|---|---|---|---|---|---|---|---|---|---|---|
| 2008 | Philadelphia | 10 | 1 | 2 | 2 | 26 | 6 | 1 | 0 | 0 | 0 | 3 | 0 |
| NLL totals | | 10 | 1 | 2 | 2 | 26 | 6 | 1 | 0 | 0 | 0 | 3 | 0 |

== See also ==
- Lacrosse in Pennsylvania
- Hofstra 2006 - Laxpower.com
