= Madison Street Methodist Episcopal Church =

Coordinates: 39.873530°N 75.405378°W

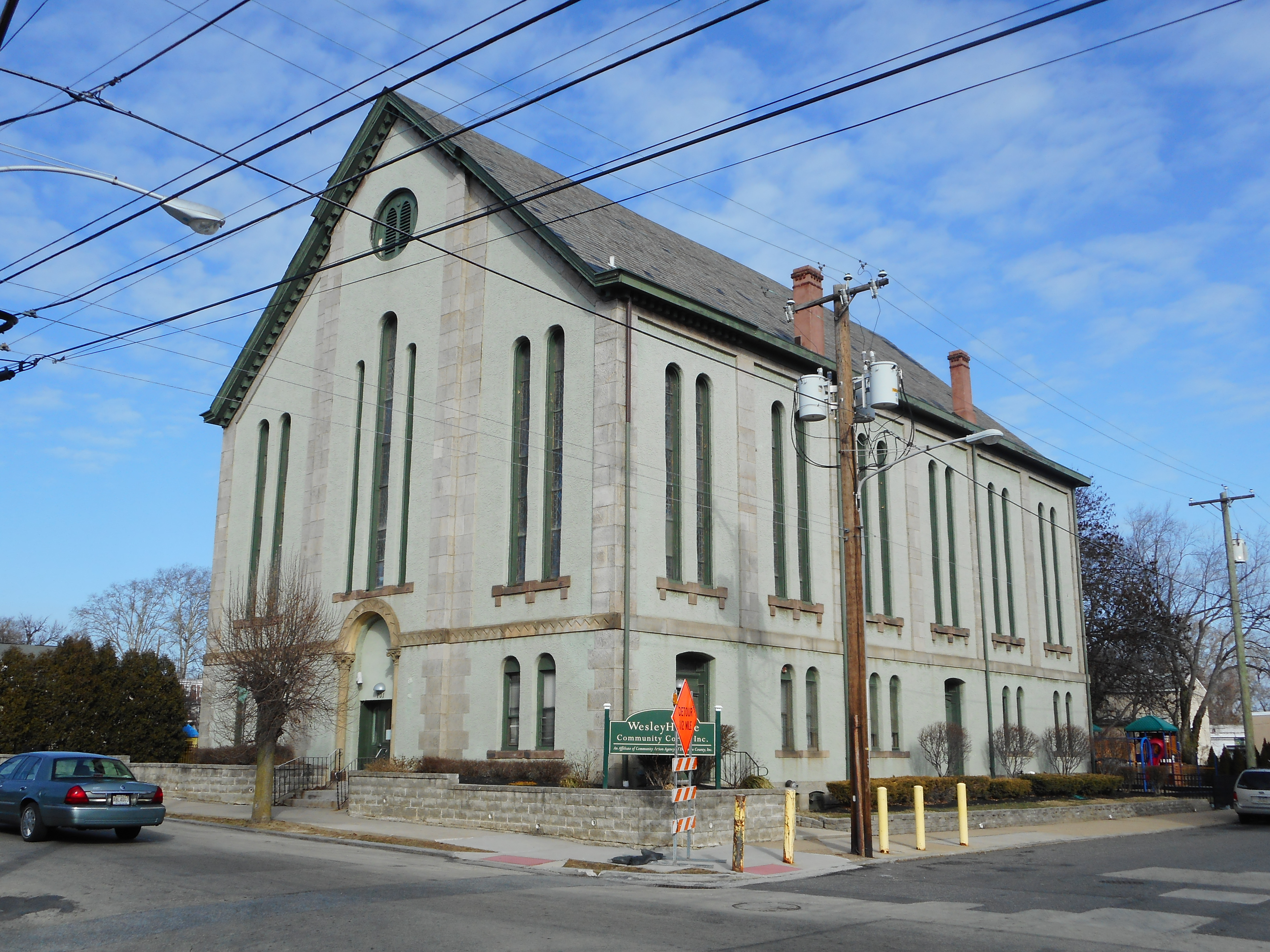
The former Madison Street Methodist Episcopal Church building in 2017

Madison Street Methodist Episcopal Church is a Methodist Episcopal Church built in 1874 in Chester, Delaware County, Pennsylvania, United States. It is located at 701 Madison Street. The building is currently being used by the Wesley House Community Corporation as a homeless shelter.

== History ==
Due to the preachings of Bishop Francis Asbury in Chester, a Methodist meeting was formed in 1810 in the home of Mrs. Mary Withey who kept a house of public entertainment known as the Columbia House located at what is now Fifth and Market Streets.

The Methodist meetings moved to the home of John Kelley in 1818. Mr. Kelley had previously been a preacher in St. George's Church in Philadelphia. When the services became too large for his home, services were moved to the Chester Court House where Bishop Asbury preached on several occasions.

The services soon outgrew the capacity of the Chester Court House and it was decided that a small church should be built. Matthew L. Bevan secured a lot on the corner of Second and Bevan Street and a small chapel named Asbury Chapel was built.

Initially there was no regular minister for the Asbury Chapel and the congregation had to rely on circuit riders to preach to them. However, in 1845 the size of the congregation warranted the appointment of a resident pastor and the Reverend Isaac R. Merrill was assigned. The congregation continued to grow under Reverend Merrill and plans for construction of a larger church were initiated.

In 1848 a green serpentine stone church was erected on a plot of land on the north side of Fifth Street between Market and Edgemont Avenue. The building was used until 1874.

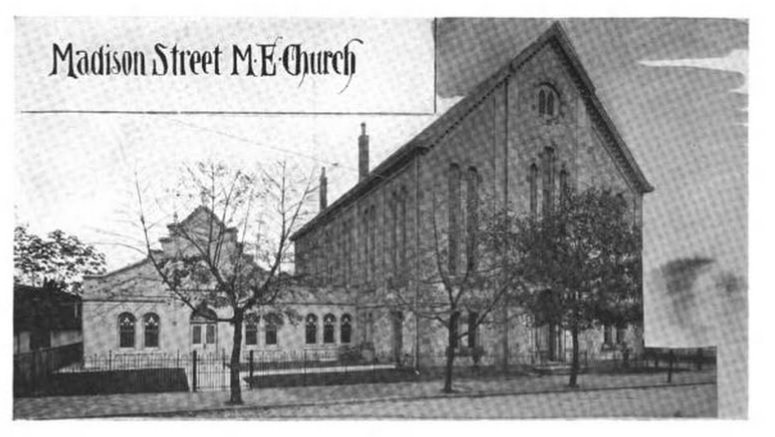
Photo of Madison Street Methodist Episcopal Church from H.V. Smith's Chester and Vicinity published in 1914

In 1872, another lot was purchased on the northeast corner of Seventh and Madison Streets and construction was initiated. On July 17, 1874, the Madison Street Methodist Episcopal Church was dedicated and opened for worship.

David Reese Esrey, the cotton goods manufacturer and banker, was president of the Board of Trustees of the Madison Street Methodist Episcopal Church and contributed liberally to the construction of the church.

On June 19, 1983, the Madison Street Methodist Episcopal Church congregation merged with the Christ United Methodist Church located at 600 Dutton Mill Road in Brookhaven, Pennsylvania.

The former Madison Street Methodist Episcopal Church is currently being used by the Wesley House Community corporation as a homeless shelter for families and single women. The facility has 17 rooms and provides shelter to over 240 individuals/75 households each year.
