= Scott Douglas Miller =

American university president

- Scott Miller (2026)

4th President of Batten University
- Incumbent
- Assumed office 2015
- Preceded by: William Thomas Greer Jr.

President of Bethany College
- In office 2007–2015
- Preceded by: G.T. Smith
- Succeeded by: Sven de Jong (Interim)

President of Wesley College
- In office 1997–2007
- Preceded by: Reed M. Stewart
- Succeeded by: J. Thomas Sturgis (Interim)

President of Lincoln Memorial University
- In office 1991–1997
- Preceded by: Gary Burchett
- Succeeded by: Martin Peters

Personal details
- Born: 1959 (age 66–67) Ridley Park, Pennsylvania
- Education: West Virginia Wesleyan College (B.A); University of Dayton (M.S.); Vanderbilt University (Ed.S); Union Institute & University (Ph.D)
- Website: batten.edu

Scott Douglas Miller is an American academic administrator and writer who has served as the fourth president of Batten University since 2015.

== Early life ==
Born in 1959, Miller is a native of Ridley Park, Pennsylvania. He graduated from General McLane High School in Edinboro, Pennsylvania, in 1977.

== Education ==
Miller holds a bachelor's degree (B.A.) from West Virginia Wesleyan College, a master's degree (M.S.) from the University of Dayton, an education specialist degree (Ed. S.) from Vanderbilt University, and a doctoral degree (Ph.D.) from Union Institute & University.

== Career ==
Miller was Director of College Relations and Alumni Affairs at Rio Grande College (now University of Rio Grande). He was executive vice president and Vice President for Development, and then president, of Lincoln Memorial University (1991–1997). He was president of Wesley College (1997–2007), Miller was accused of plagiarism in 2000 and 2006 while president of Wesley College. The college's board of trustees appointed an external panel to investigate. The panel's report was not conclusive, with some charges found to be implausible while others may have occurred with Miller's permission or participation. Nevertheless, the board remained supportive of Miller in light of the college's accomplishments under his leadership and suspicious of the timing and motivation of those making the allegations. He was subsequently hired to be president of Bethany College, where the board of trustees knew of these allegations, and then Virginia Wesleyan University. Wesley College named their stadium in his honor in 2007.

Miller was the president of Bethany College (2007–15), He was named as the fourth president of Virginia Wesleyan University on February 25, 2015.

Miller served as chair of the Climate Leadership Network from 2019 to 2021 and served on the board of directors of Boston-based Second Nature, an international environmental and climate advocacy group. He was chair (2013-2023) of the board of directors of Washington, D.C.–based executive search firm Academic Search, Inc., and the vice chair of the American Academic Leadership Institute.

He is a former president of the National Association of Schools, Colleges, and Universities of the United Methodist Church (NASCUMC). Miller served as the president of the North American Association of Methodist Schools, Colleges and Universities (NAAMSCU) from 2019 to 2021. He served as President/Chair (2011-15) of the board of directors of The Council of Colleges and Universities of the Christian Church (Disciples of Christ).

He is the executive editor of President to President, formerly known as Presidential Perspectives, an online presidential thought series.

== Personal life ==
He and his wife, Annie Miller, have two daughters and four grandchildren. They reside on the Virginia Wesleyan campus in the president's residence, DeFord Manor, in Virginia Beach, Virginia.

Academic offices
| Preceded by Gary Burchett | President of Lincoln Memorial University; 1991 – 1997 | Succeeded by Martin Peters |
| Preceded by Reed M. Stewart | President of the Wesley College; 1997 – 2007 | Succeeded by J. Thomas Sturgis (Interim) |
| Preceded by G.T. Smith | President of the Bethany College; 2007 – 2015 | Succeeded by Sven de Jong (Interim) |
| Preceded by William Thomas Greer Jr. | President of Virginia Wesleyan University; 2015 – present | Incumbent |
