= Holmes, Pennsylvania =

Unincorporated community in Pennsylvania, US

- Unincorporated community
- Location within the state of Pennsylvania Holmes (the United States)
- Coordinates: 39°54′15″N 75°18′31″W
- Country: United States
- State: Pennsylvania
- County: Delaware
- Township: Ridley
- Time zone: UTC-5 (Eastern (EST))
  - Summer (DST): UTC-4 (EDT)
- ZIP code: 19043
- Area codes: 610 and 484
- GNIS feature ID: 1177231

Holmes is an unincorporated community in Ridley Township, Delaware County, Pennsylvania, United States. It is located at 39°54′15″N 75°18′31″W (39.9042791, −75.3085204).

== History ==
The town was named for Richard Holmes, a farmer whose family lived in Holmes for almost 100 years. The family's homestead stood where the MacDade Mall stands today.
