= Joseph Shackford Johnston =

Former President of Virginia Wesleyan College
- In office 1965–1965
- Succeeded by: Lambuth McGeehee Clarke

Personal details
- Born: 1910 Farmville, Virginia
- Died: April 8, 2004 (aged 93–94) White Stone, Virginia
- Spouse: Edna Cralle Sanders Johnston (1936)
- Children: Anne J. Owen, Ginger Philbrick, and Joe Johnston
- Education: University of Virginia; Yale University; Randolph-Macon College
- Profession: Minister, Author

Joseph Shackford Johnston was the first president of Virginia Wesleyan College.

== Education ==
Johnston received a bachelor's degree from the University of Virginia, a master's degree in divinity from Yale University, and he received an honorary doctorate of divinity from Randolph-Macon College.

== Presidency of Virginia Wesleyan College ==
Johnston was a prominent figure in helping to procure the charter for Virginia Wesleyan College in 1961. Johnston was elected the first president of Virginia Wesleyan College in 1965 after serving as the primary advocate for the development and establishment of the institution.

== Personal life ==
Joseph Shackford Johnston was married to Edna Cralle' Sanders Johnston in 1936, and together they had three children, daughters Anne J. Owen and Ginger Philbrick, and son Joe Johnston.

Johnston served as the minister in the Methodist Church through most of Virginia. In 1959 he was named the District Superintendent of the Norfolk District of the Methodist Church. Following his appointment as Superintendent, Johnston then began to get involved in the development of Virginia Wesleyan.

| Academic offices | President of Virginia Wesleyan University; 1965 | Succeeded by Lambuth McGeehee Clarke |
