= Gerald J. Spitz =

American politician

Member of the Pennsylvania House of Representatives from the 162nd district
- In office 1977–1984
- Preceded by: Patrick B. Gillespie
- Succeeded by: Ronald C. Raymond

Personal details
- Born: June 23, 1941 Ridley Park, Pennsylvania, US
- Died: December 5, 2013 (aged 72) Philadelphia, Pennsylvania, US
- Party: Republican
- Spouse: Pamela
- Education: Ridley Park High School; Pennsylvania Military College; Dickinson School of Law
- Occupation: Administrative Law Judge, Social Security Administration

Gerald Joseph Spitz (June 23, 1941 – December 5, 2013) was an American politician who served as a Republican member of the Pennsylvania House of Representatives for the 162nd district from 1977 to 1984.

== Early life and education ==
Spitz was born in Ridley Park, Pennsylvania, and attended Ridley Park High School. He received a B.A. from Pennsylvania Military College in 1963 and a J.D. from Dickinson Law School in 1966.

He served as 1st lieutenant in the 101st airborne in the United States Army from 1966 to 1969 during the Vietnam War.

== Career ==
Spitz served as Deputy District Attorney and as Special Prosecutor for Delaware County.

He was elected to the Pennsylvania House of Representatives for the 162nd district and served from 1977 to 1984. He was not a candidate for reelection in 1985.

He worked as an Administrative Law Judge for the United States Social Security Administration.

Spitz died on December 5, 2013, of sarcoidosis. He was 72.
