= Leedom Estates, Pennsylvania =

Unincorporated community in Pennsylvania, U.S.

Coordinates: 39°52′27″N 75°19′17″W

Leedom Estates is a small unincorporated community in Ridley Township, Pennsylvania, founded in 1867. It sits alongside Interstate 95 south of Philadelphia in Delaware County.
