= David Reese Esrey =

American businessman and banker

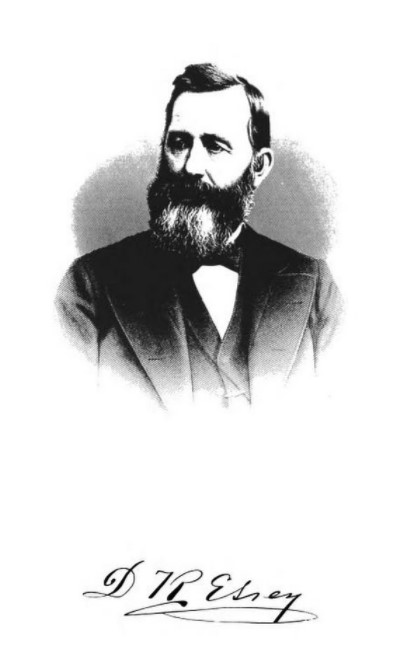
- Born: December 4, 1825; Ridley Township, Pennsylvania, U.S.
- Died: April 11, 1898 (aged 72)
- Resting place: Chester Rural Cemetery, Chester, Pennsylvania, U.S.
- Occupation(s): clothing manufacturer and banker

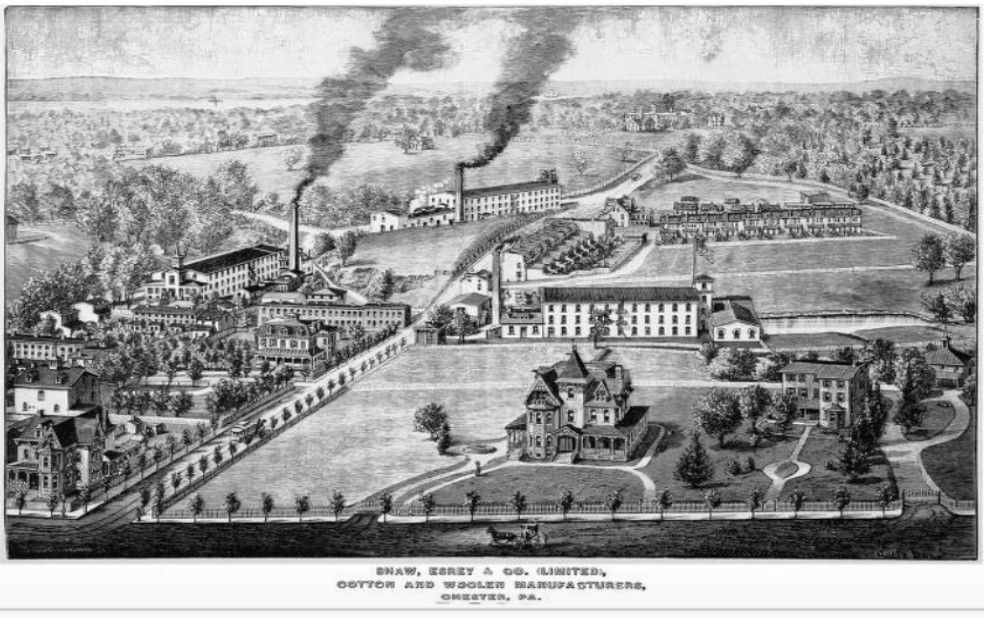
Shaw, Esrey & Company Mills in Chester, Pennsylvania

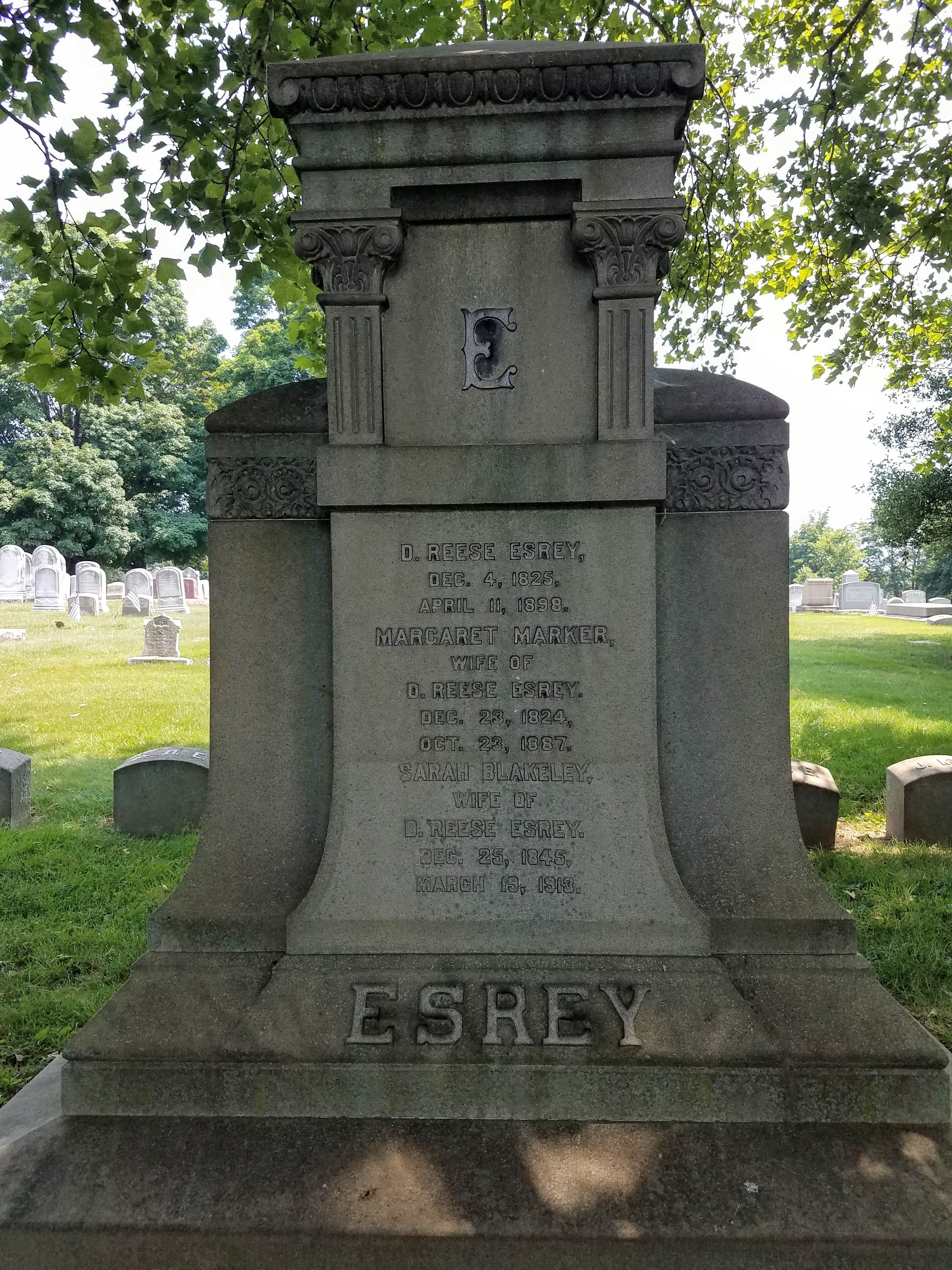
David Reese Esrey grave at Chester Rural Cemetery in Chester, Pennsylvania

David Reese Esrey (December 4, 1825 – April 11, 1898) was an American businessman and banker from Chester, Pennsylvania.

== Early life ==
Esrey was born in Ridley Township, Pennsylvania to Jonathan and Margaret (Kerlin) Esrey. He was educated in the public schools of Nether Providence, Pennsylvania.

== Career ==
In 1844, Esrey obtained a position in a general store in Brookhaven, Pennsylvania. Within six years, Esrey became the owner of the business.

In 1863, Esrey entered into business partnership with Hugh Shaw for the manufacturing of cotton goods. The firm purchased an interest in the Pennelton Mills in Aston, Pennsylvania and began making Powhattan Jeans.

In 1866, Esrey and Shaw built a mill just outside the city limits of Chester, Pennsylvania and named the area Powhattan.

Esrey and Shaw built a second mill in 1871 and third mill in 1877. The property containing the three mills was approximately 20 acres. The goods manufactured in these mills were known as Powhattans, Covingtons, Provident and all wool jeans.

In 1878, Esrey became a director of the Delaware County National Bank and served until his death.

In 1879, the firm became a limited corporation under the name Shaw, Esrey & Company.

== Philanthropy ==
Esrey was president of the Board of Trustees of the Madison Street Methodist Episcopal Church and contributed generously to the construction of the church.

Esrey was one of the managers of the Chester Hospital.

== Personal life ==
In 1850, Esrey married Margaret Marker and together they had five children. Margaret died in 1866 and Esrey subsequently married Sarah E. Blakely.

Esrey is interred at the Chester Rural Cemetery.

== Legacy ==
Esrey Street in Chester, Pennsylvania (formerly known as Pine Street) was named in honor of Esrey.
