= Isaac Hinckley =

Isaac Hinckley (1815-1888) was a president of the Philadelphia, Wilmington and Baltimore Railroad and the founder of Ridley Park, Pennsylvania.

Hinckley was born on Oct. 28, 1815, in Hingham, Massachusetts, a son of Isaac Hinckley (1793-1818), who had gone to sea at a young age and rose to command three ships: the brig Reaper (1809–10), which he sailed on a trading voyage from Boston to Aden and Calcutta; the ship Tartar (1812–13), on another voyage to Calcutta; and finally the ship Canton (1815–18) for three voyages from Boston to Guangdong, China. He died while homebound on the third of these. The shipmaster left a widow in Hingham and six children, aged 2 to 11, including three-year-old Isaac.

The younger Isaac Hinckley graduated from Harvard University in 1834. He took his first railroad job in 1846, as Superintendent of Transportation for the Boston and Providence Railroad and worked there until January 1848. He then took other railroad jobs and on April 1, 1865, was appointed president of the PW&B.

He was also president of the Junction Railroad, the short line built to connect the PW&B and three other railroads in West Philadelphia.

In 1880 and 1881, Hinckley helped the PRR take control of the PW&B, a move that ultimately forced the Baltimore and Ohio Railroad to build a costly new southwest approach to Philadelphia.

On Dec. 12, 1887, Hinckley chartered Ridley Park, a borough to the southwest of Philadelphia, in an effort to create an analog to the Philadelphia Main Line string of suburbs founded and served, lucratively, by the Pennsylvania Railroad.

Hinckley died in Philadelphia, still the president of the PW&B, on March 28, 1888.
