= Rocco J. Carzo =

American football and lacrosse coach (c.1932–2022)

Biographical details
- Born: c. 1932
- Died: January 16, 2022 (aged 89)

Playing career

Football
- 1950–1953: Delaware
- Position: Fullback

Coaching career (HC unless noted)

Football
- 1955: Salesianum School (DE) (assistant)
- 1956–1959: Delaware (assistant)
- 1960–1965: California (backfield)
- 1966–1973: Tufts

Lacrosse
- 1958–1959: Delaware

Administrative career (AD unless noted)
- 1973–1999: Tufts

Head coaching record
- Overall: 22–41–1 (football); 10–10 (lacrosse)

Rocco J. "Rocky" Carzo (c. 1932 – January 16, 2022) was an American college football and college lacrosse coach and athletics administrator. He served as the head football coach at Tufts University from 1966 to 1973, compiling a record of 22–41–1. A native of Woodlyn, Pennsylvania, Carzo played football as a fullback at the University of Delaware from 1950 to 1953. He was also the head lacrosse coach at Delaware from 1958 to 1959, tallying a mark of 10–10. Carzo was the athletic director at Tufts from 1973 to 1999.

Carzo died on January 16, 2022, at the age of 89.

== Head coaching record ==
=== Football ===
Year	Team	Overall	Conference	Standing	Bowl/playoffs
Tufts Jumbos (NCAA College Division independent) (1966–1970)
1966	Tufts	1–7			
1967	Tufts	1–6–1			
1968	Tufts	5–3			
1969	Tufts	6–2			
1970	Tufts	1–7			
Tufts Jumbos (New England Small College Athletic Conference) (1971–1973)
1971	Tufts	3–5			
1972	Tufts	4–4	1–4		
1973	Tufts	1–7	1–4		
Tufts:		22–41–1			
Total:		22–41–1			
