= Crum Lynne, Pennsylvania =

Unincorporated community in Pennsylvania, US

- Unincorporated community
- Location of Crum Lynne, Pennsylvania Crum Lynne (the United States)
- Coordinates: 39°52′20″N 75°19′41″W
- Country: United States
- State: Pennsylvania
- County: Delaware
- Township: Ridley
- Elevation: 62 ft (19 m)
- Time zone: UTC-5 (Eastern (EST))
  - Summer (DST): UTC-4 (EDT)
- ZIP code: 19022
- Area codes: 610 and 484
- FIPS code: 42-42045
- GNIS feature ID: 1203375
- Other names: Leiperville; Crumlynne

Crum Lynne is an unincorporated community in Ridley Township, Delaware County, Pennsylvania, United States.

== Geography ==
Crum Lynne is located at 39°52′20″N 75°19′41″W (39.872335, -75.327966). Its elevation is 62 feet (19 m) and its hardiness zones are 7a and 7b. It has a humid subtropical climate (Cfa) and average monthly temperatures range from 33.4 °F in January to 78.2 °F in July.

== Transportation ==
A station on the former Pennsylvania Railroad Philadelphia - Baltimore line, now the Crum Lynne SEPTA regional rail station, was named by a Pennsylvania Railroad vice president after Crumlin, Wales, where his mother was born.

The town also houses the headquarters of the Federal Railroad Administration's Office of Safety for Region 2, which governs Delaware, Maryland, New Jersey (from Camden south), Pennsylvania, Ohio, Virginia, West Virginia, and the District of Columbia.

Interstates 95 and 476 have an interchange in Crum Lynne. They form the southern and western boundaries, respectively. MacDade Boulevard is Crum Lynne's main east-to-west thoroughfare and parallels 95.

== Notable people ==
- Bert Cooper, professional boxer
- Kurupt, rapper
- Sylvia Seegrist, mass murderer
- Damiere Shaw, NCAA coach
- Dino Vasso, NFL coach
