= Lambuth McGeehee Clarke =

President of Virginia Wesleyan College
- In office 1966–1992
- Preceded by: Joseph Shackford Johnston
- Succeeded by: William Thomas Greer Jr.

Personal details
- Born: 1923
- Died: September 20, 2006 (aged 82–83) Norfolk, Virginia
- Spouse: Alice A. Clarke
- Children: 4
- Education: Randolph-Macon College; Johns Hopkins University
- Profession: English professor

Lambuth McGeehee Clarke was the second president of Virginia Wesleyan College.

== Education ==
He received a bachelor's from Randolph-Macon College, a master's from Johns Hopkins University and a doctorate of law from Randolph-Macon College.

== Presidency of Virginia Wesleyan College ==
Lambuth McGeehee Clarke was the president of Virginia Wesleyan College when the college opened its doors in 1966 to its first students. He helped grow the college's student body from just 75 students to 1,440 in 1992 when he retired. The operating budget of the college grew as well with the increase in the student body from $250,000 to $14.6 million.

== Personal life ==
Lambuth McGeehee Clarke was married to Alice A. Clarke, and together they had four children, son Palmore Clarke, and daughters, Virginia Clarke Hitch, Jessica Clarke and Leighton Clarke Krips.

Academic offices
| Preceded by Joseph Shackford Johnston | President of Virginia Wesleyan University; 1966-1992 | Succeeded by William Thomas Greer Jr. |
