= Nicholas Miccarelli III =

American politician

Member of the Pennsylvania House of Representatives from the 162nd district
- In office January 6, 2009 – January 2019
- Preceded by: Ronald C. Raymond
- Succeeded by: David Delloso

Personal details
- Born: June 10, 1982 (age 44) Wilmington, Delaware, U.S.
- Party: Republican
- Education: University of Pennsylvania

Military service
- Allegiance: United States
- Branch/service: United States Army; Pennsylvania Army National Guard
- Years of service: 1999–present
- Rank: Staff sergeant
- Battles/wars: Iraq War

Nicholas "Nick" Miccarelli III (born June 10, 1982) was an American politician from Pennsylvania who served as a Republican member of the Pennsylvania House of Representatives for the 162nd legislative district until January 2019.

After his election in 2008, Miccarelli was deployed to Iraq with his Pennsylvania National Guard Unit in February 2009 and took leave from the Pennsylvania General Assembly for the duration of his deployment. In December 2009, Miccarelli returned to the House upon completion of his tour in Iraq.

He was re-elected to his second term in November 2010, and to his third term in November 2012. He did not run for re-election in 2018.

== Political ==
=== State representative ===
He served as the chief of staff to Representative Ron Raymond and declared as a candidate after Raymond announced that he would retire from the House after the 2008 elections.

In his first race, Miccarelli faced Democrat John Defrancisco, a Delaware County union leader, gaining the endorsement of the United Auto Workers Local 1069 where Defrancisco once served as union president. In the general election, Miccarelli was victorious, taking 57.5% of the vote.

Shortly after the race, Miccarelli was informed that his unit in the Pennsylvania Army National Guard was deploying to Iraq. Miccarelli deployed in February 2009 and currently serves with Rep. Scott Perry who was also called to active duty.

Miccarelli is prohibited by law from voting or conducting legislative business while on duty. This restriction led the leader of the Delaware County Democratic Party to ask for Miccarelli's resignation as he will be unable to serve his constituents for half of his first term in office.

Miccarelli has said that he would not resign and that the leaders of both the Democratic and Republican caucuses in the House were supportive of him and Rep. Scott Perry.

In 2010, Miccarelli faced Scott MacNeil, a Democratic Sharon Hill Borough councilman, in his re-election campaign. Miccarelli was re-elected on November 2, 2010, defeating challenger Scott MacNeil. by 6,822 votes.

He did not run for re-election in 2018.

=== Sexual assault scandal ===
On February 28, 2018, The Philadelphia Inquirer published an extensive report detailing the allegations of multiple women that Miccarelli had sexually and physically assaulted them on multiple occasions spanning six years. House leaders launched an inquiry into these allegations. His party's leaders the next day called upon Miccarelli to step down and Miccarelli was stripped of his security privileges at the capital.
