= Joseph Dorsey (politician) =

American politician

Joseph W. Dorsey

Member of the Pennsylvania House of Representatives from the 162nd district
- In office 1969–1974
- Preceded by: District created
- Succeeded by: Patrick B. Gillespie

Member of the Pennsylvania House of Representatives from the Delaware County district
- In office 1967–1968

Personal details
- Born: September 24, 1921 Ridley Park, Pennsylvania, US
- Died: March 15, 1999 (aged 77) Upland, Pennsylvania, US
- Party: Republican

Joseph W. Dorsey (September 24, 1921 – March 15, 1999) was an American politician from Pennsylvania who served as a Republican member of the Pennsylvania House of Representatives for Delaware County from 1967 to 1968 and for the 162nd district from 1969 to 1974.

== Early life and education ==
Dorsey was born in Ridley Park, Pennsylvania. He attended the Columbia Institute of Technology and the Fels Institute of Government of the University of Pennsylvania. He served in the United States Army Air Corps during World War II.

== Career ==
Dosey worked as an insurance broker. He served as a member of the Collingdale city council from 1950 to 1962.

He was elected to the Pennsylvania House of Representatives and served from 1967 to 1974. He was not a candidate for reelection to the House in 1975.

He was elected clerk of courts of Delaware County and served from 1975 to 1978 and as director of the Office of Judicial Support for Delaware County from 1979 to 1999.

In 1986, he worked as campaign manager for Curt Weldon during his run for Congress.
