= David Delloso =

American politician

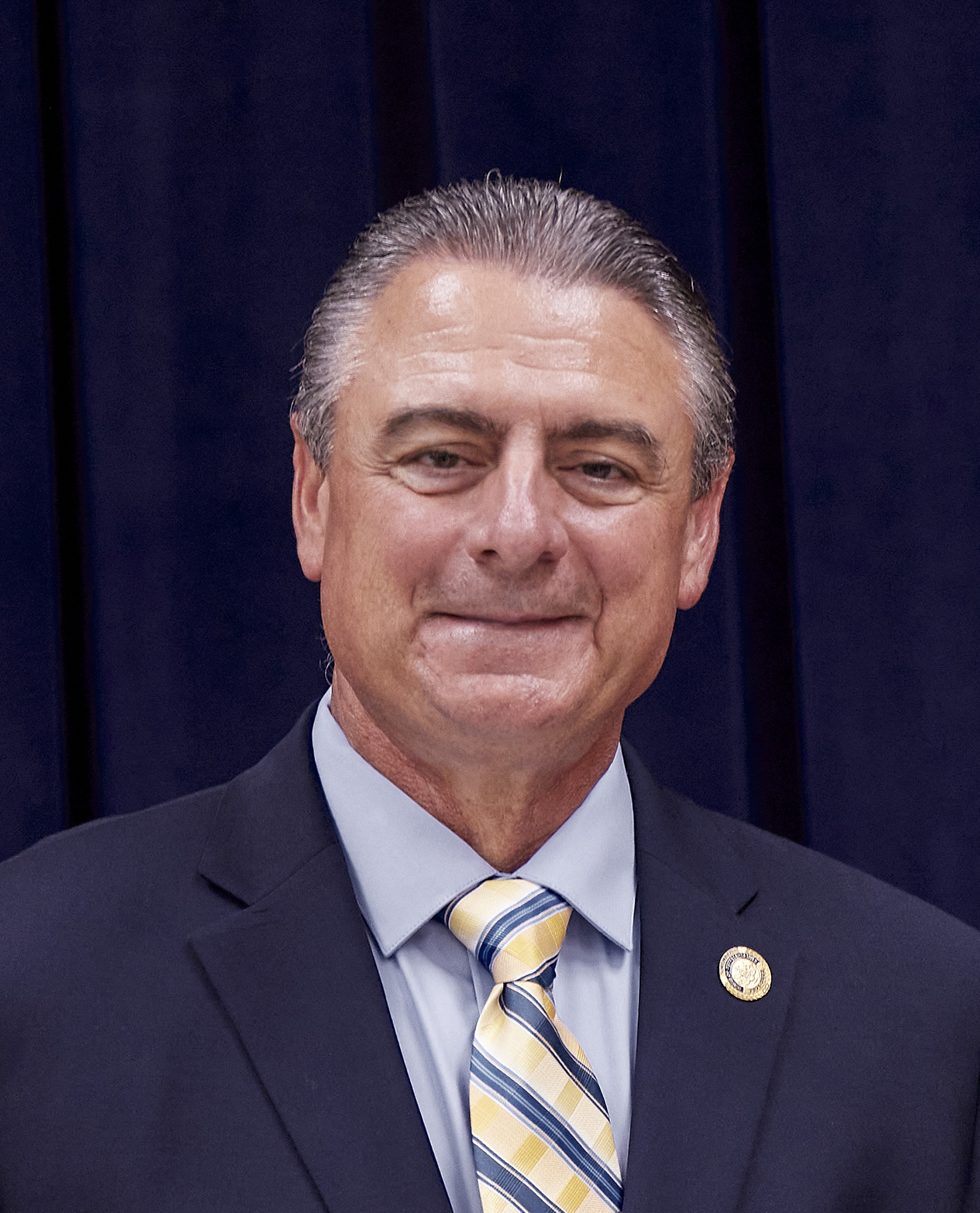

Member of the Pennsylvania House of Representatives from the 162nd district
- Incumbent
- Assumed office January 1, 2019
- Preceded by: Nicholas Miccarelli III

Personal details
- Born: June 18, 1965 (age 61)
- Party: Democratic
- Education: Mansfield University of Pennsylvania
- Occupation: Truck driver

David M. Delloso (born June 18, 1965) is a Democratic member of the Pennsylvania House of Representatives. He has represented the 162nd district since 2019.

== Biography ==
After graduating from Academy Park High School, Delloso attended Mansfield University of Pennsylvania. He was in the USMC Reserve from 1984 to 1990 and 1991 to 1993. He was president of the Teamsters Local 312.

Delloso defeated Mary Hopper in the 162nd district in 2018, receiving 12,826 votes. The seat became open after Nicholas Miccarelli III declined to run due to rape allegations.

In October 2019, Delloso introduced House Bill 1899, which would make cannabis accessible at state-run liquor stores.

He is married to his wife Susan.
