= Lakeland University Japan =

Coordinates: 35°41′37.38″N 138°42′34.98″E

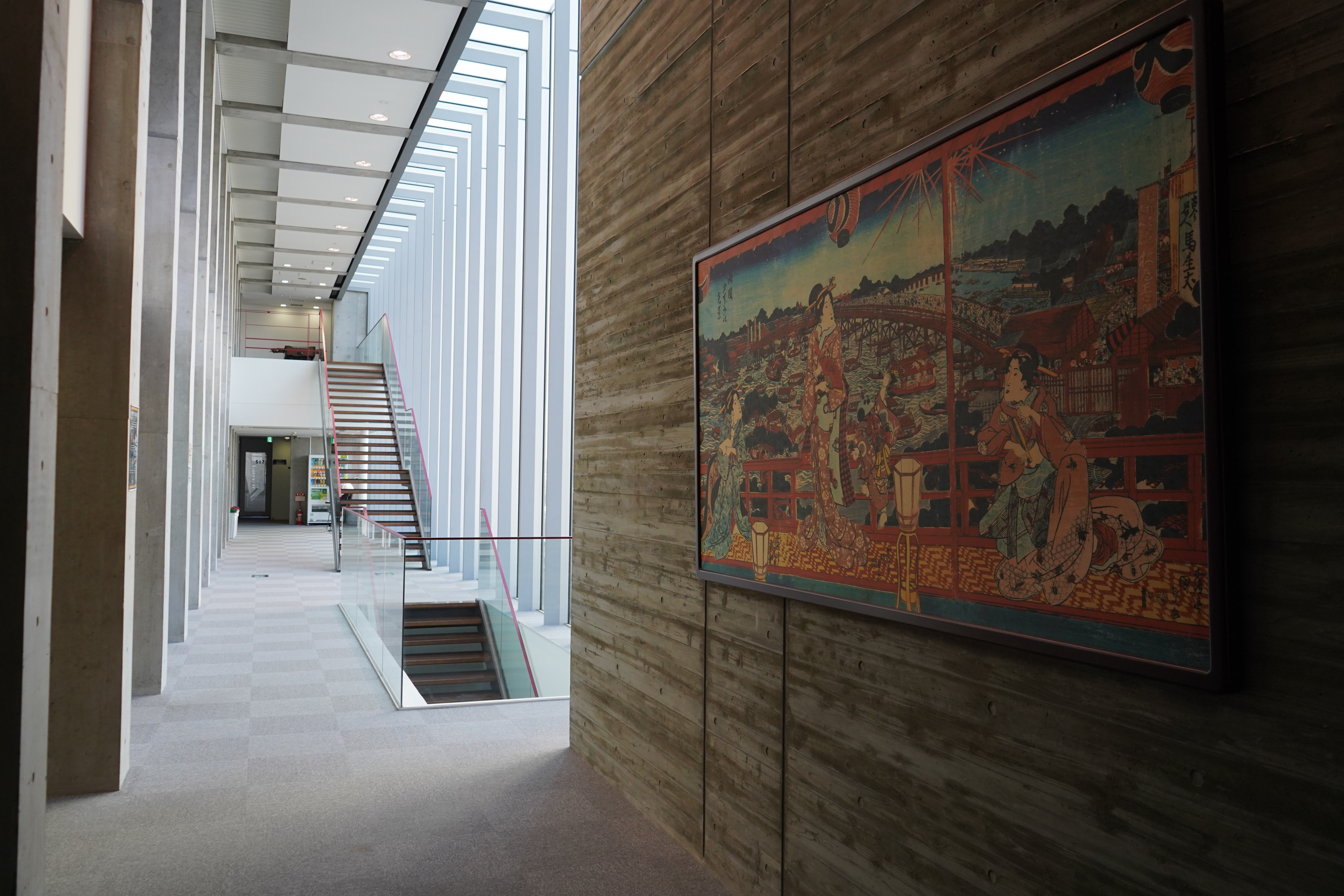
Lakeland University Japan Campus

Lakeland University Japan (レイクランド大学ジャパン・キャンパス) is a four-year liberal arts college located in the Sumida ward of Tokyo, Japan and is a branch campus of Lakeland University in Sheboygan, Wisconsin.

Lakeland University Japan was continuously accredited by the North Central Association of Colleges and Schools and the MEXT (文部科学省) from its founding in 1991. However, the North Central Association of Colleges and Schools dissolved in 2014 and was reorganized as the Higher Learning Commission (HLC). Therefore, in 2018, the HLC was the accrediting agency.

Until the mid-2020s, students would complete a two-year Associate of Arts (A.A.) degree, subsequently having the option to choose between attending Lakeland University or Virginia Wesleyan University in the United States to complete a four-year Bachelor of Arts degree. However, presently, students can now complete a 4-year degree, and even master's degrees, at the Japan campus.
