= Ridley High School =

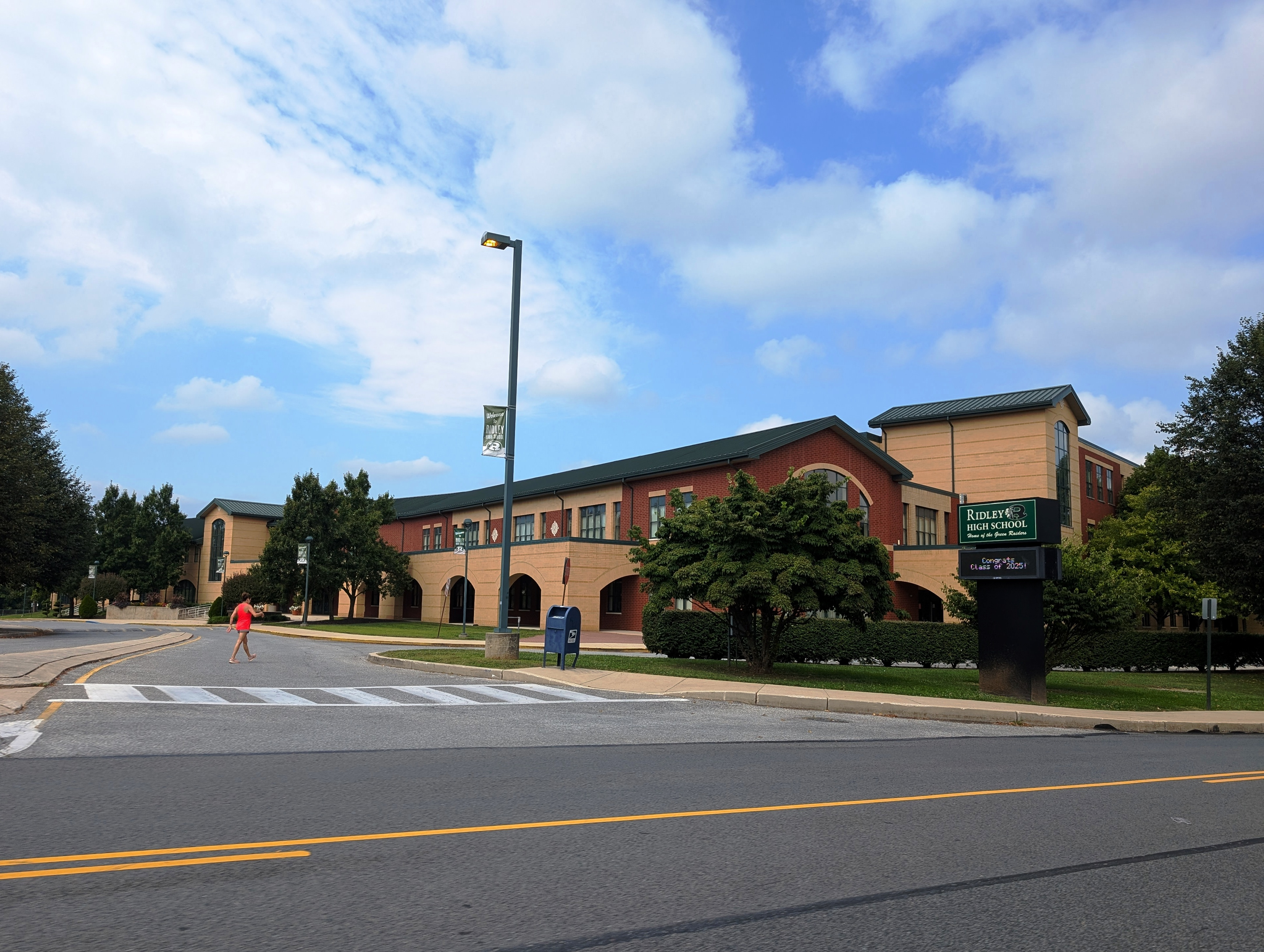

Location
- 901 Morton Avenue; Folsom, Pennsylvania 19033; United States; 39°53′30″N 75°20′07″W

Information
- Type: Public High School
- Established: 1934
- School district: Ridley School District
- Principal: Jamie Peña
- Teaching staff: 129.90 (FTE)
- Grades: 9–12
- Enrollment: 1,888 (2023–2024)
- Student to teacher ratio: 14.53
- Colors: Green and White
- Mascot: Green Raider
- Website: www.ridleysd.org/o/rhs

Ridley High School serves the Ridley School District. It is located in Folsom, Pennsylvania, United States. The new high school opened in September 2001. In the 2022–23 school year, Ridley High School had 1,869 students.

== History ==
The original building, previously known as Ridley Township High School, was completed in 1934 and was built, in part, by funding from the Works Progress Administration. The library, auditorium, and gym additions of the old school from the late 1960s still stand and are used as a community center. In 2001 a new building was constructed. The sports teams use the community center gym for indoor training. The school had added a pond for the students involved with environmental classes and activities. Ridley also has a natatorium with a 25-yard pool.

== Demographics ==
Overall, Ridley High School served 1,869 students in the 2022-23 school year. Of these, 68.3% were White, 16.6% Black, 6.3% Hispanic, 4.9% two or more races, 3.5% Asian, and 0.4% American Indian/Alaska Native. 49% of students are eligible for a free or reduced price lunch.

== Extracurriculars ==
The district offers a variety of clubs, activities, and sports.

=== Athletics ===
Ridley sports teams compete in the Central League and include:

- Baseball
- Basketball
- Cheerleading
- Cross Country
- Football
- Field Hockey
- Golf
- Ice hockey
- Lacrosse
- Soccer
- Softball
- Swimming and Diving
- Tennis
- Track & Field
- Indoor Track
- Volleyball
- Wrestling

=== Windscript ===
Ridley High School's literary-arts magazine serves as an outlet for student creativity. Windscript won the Gold Crown Award from the Columbia Scholastic Press Association of Columbia University in 2006.

== Notable alumni ==
- Jim Beard, jazz musician and member of Steely Dan
- Matt Blundin (1987), former NFL quarterback, Kansas City Chiefs
- Wendell Butler Jr., mayor of Chester, Pennsylvania
- Paul Felder (2004) UFC lightweight and former CFFC lightweight champion
- Philip S. Johnson (1970), violinist
- Carol Kazeem (2010), Pennsylvania State Representative
- Bob Kuberski (1989), former NFL defensive lineman, member of Super Bowl XXXI champion Green Bay Packers
- Bill McGlone (2002), professional lacrosse player
- Michael Philip Mossman, jazz musician and film composer
- Brett Moyer (2002), lacrosse player
- Ethan Pecko (2020), baseball player
- Bob Rigby, former professional soccer player, former member of United States men's national soccer team
- Dave Schulthise, bassist, Dead Milkmen
- J. Randy Taraborrelli, New York Times best-selling author
- Joe Valerio (1987), former NFL player, Kansas City Chiefs
- Mike Picciotti (1957) World Ranked Professional Boxer
- David E. Zitarelli (1941–2018), mathematician and historian of mathematics
