= Chesapeake Bay Academy =

Private school in Virginia Beach, Virginia, US

Location
- 821 Baker Road; Virginia Beach, Virginia 23462; USA; 36°51′57.5″N 76°10′55″W

Information
- School type: Private
- Religious affiliation: Nonsectarian
- Established: 1989
- Head of school: Judy Jankowski, Ed.D.
- Faculty: 34
- Grades: K-12
- Gender: Co-Educational
- Enrollment: 110 students
- Student to teacher ratio: 5:4
- Campus type: Large city/Suburban
- Colors: Light Blue, Black, White,
- Athletics: basketball, bowling, cross country, ping pong, soccer, volleyball
- Mascot: Dolphin
- Nickname: Dolphins
- Tuition: $26,450–$28,875 (2024-2025)
- Website: http://www.cba-va.org/

Chesapeake Bay Academy is a private, college preparatory school located in Virginia Beach, Virginia, United States. The school educates and guides students with learning disabilities, including attention disorders (ADHD), dyslexia, and dysgraphia.
