= Patrick B. Gillespie =

American politician (1945–2022)

Member of the Pennsylvania House of Representatives from the 162nd district
- In office 1975–1978
- Preceded by: Joseph Dorsey
- Succeeded by: Gerald J. Spitz

Personal details
- Born: November 23, 1945 Philadelphia, Pennsylvania, U.S.
- Died: August 29, 2022 (aged 76) Havertown, Pennsylvania, U.S.
- Party: Democratic

Patrick B. Gillespie Sr. (November 23, 1945 – August 29, 2022) was an American politician who served as a Democratic member of the Pennsylvania House of Representatives for the 162nd district from 1975 to 1976.

== Early life and education ==
Gillespie was born in Philadelphia, Pennsylvania. He graduated from St. Thomas More High School in 1963 and attended St. Joseph College of Industrial Relations.

== Career ==
He was elected to the Pennsylvania House of Representatives for the 162nd district and served from 1975 to 1976.
