= William Thomas Greer Jr. =

US education director (born 1943)

Former President of Virginia Wesleyan College
- In office January 1992 – June 2015
- Preceded by: Lambuth McGeehee Clarke
- Succeeded by: Scott Douglas Miller

Personal details
- Born: July 28. 1942 Georgia (U.S. state)
- Died: August 30, 2023
- Spouse: Fann Dewar Greer
- Children: William T. Greer III; Robert Dewar Greer; David Benjamin Greer
- Education: Valdosta State College; Georgia State University
- Profession: Minister; Professor; Author
- Nickname: Billy

William Thomas Greer Jr. was the third president of Virginia Wesleyan College and was named president emeritus upon his retirement in 2015.

Prior to his appointment as the president of Virginia Wesleyan College, Greer served as the president of both Brevard College and Andrew College. He was also a minister for the United Methodist Church in his home state of Georgia.

== Education ==
Greer earned a bachelor's degree from Valdosta State University, his master's in divinity from Drew Theological Seminary, a doctorate in sacred theology from Emory University, and his Ph.D. in Higher Education from Georgia State University.

== Presidency of Virginia Wesleyan College ==
President Greer served as the leader of Virginia Wesleyan College (VWC) for 22 years from January 1992 until his retirement in June 2015. Under his leadership, the college grew in size to include new buildings and facilities, higher student enrollment, additional faculty and staff, and a growth in endowments.

Greer saw projects such as the Jane P. Batten Student Center and Brock Village built during his tenure. VWC made strides toward becoming a Phi Beta Kappa-caliber institution under Greer's direction. The Birdsong Community Service Program was also established under Greer's presidency. The program greatly increased opportunities for students to volunteer throughout the community to help the needs and to support the surrounding areas.

Upon his retirement, Greer had boosted the college's enrollment and left behind an endowment of $55 million, nearly quadrupling the amount from his first years as president.

In May 2015, an announcement was made about the addition of the Greer Environmental Sciences Building to the VWU campus. The 44,000 square foot facility is Leadership in Energy and Environmental Design (LEED) certified.

== Personal life ==
William Thomas Greer Jr. is married to Fann Dewar Greer and together they have three sons William T. Greer III, Robert Dewar Greer, and David Benjamin Greer.

Academic offices
| Preceded by Lambuth McGeehee Clarke | President of Virginia Wesleyan College; 1992-2015 | Succeeded by Scott Douglas Miller |
