= George Trosley =

American artist (born 1947)

George Trosley (born 1947) is an American cartoonist known for his cartoons published in CARtoons and Hustler.

== Biography ==
Born in 1947 to a working-class family in Woodlyn, Delaware County, Pennsylvania, Trosley was fascinated by cars and drawing from early childhood. He received formal art training through his teens at the insistence of his fourth grade teacher. Trosley graduated from high school in 1965 and attended the Hussian School of Commercial Art for four years.

After graduation, Trosley worked as a professional artist at a number of studios in Philadelphia, but found the work unrewarding. In 1973, Trosley set out on his own as a freelance cartoonist, and soon after, he was hired by CARtoons as a regular contributor.

The same year, he married his longtime girlfriend, Susan. They had two children, Andrea, born in 1977 and George III, born in 1989.

== Work ==
Trosley is the creator of Krass & Bernie, a comic strip which ran continuously in CARtoons from 1975 until that magazine's last issue in August 1991. Since May 2005, new episodes of Krass & Bernie have been printed in Car Craft. Some issues of CARtoons contained two or three separate Krass & Bernie stories. Trosley also produced many other features for CARtoons, including a regular "How To Draw Cars" instructional series. A book was published containing many of these "How To Draw Cars" articles, titled Trosley's How To Draw Cartoon Cars.

Since its debut issue in 1974, Trosley has produced adult-themed, satirical gag cartoons and comic strips for Hustler magazine and its sister publications Hustler Humor and Chic.

In 2021, Trosley created an NFT project called Jungle Freaks where he collaborated with his son to create 10,000 generative zombie/ape NFTs. The collection sold out on mint and resides on the Ethereum blockchain and can be viewed on OpenSea Not long after the mint, broad discussion of Trosley's racist cartoons for Hustler led to a collapse in the collection's value.
