= Ridley School District =

School district in Delaware County, Pennsylvania, U.S.

Coordinates: 39.8924°N 75.3359°W

Address
- 901 Morton Avenue Folsom, Pennsylvania, 19033; United States

District information
- Type: Public
- Established: 1967
- NCES District ID: 4220370

Students and staff
- Students: 5,645
- Teachers: 409.5
- Student–teacher ratio: 13.8:1
- Colors: Green & white

Other information
- Website: www.ridleysd.org

Ridley School District is a large, suburban public school district in southeastern Delaware County, Pennsylvania. It serves the residents of Ridley Township, and the boroughs of Ridley Park and Eddystone. The township includes the census-designated places of Folsom and Woodlyn.

Ridley School District encompasses approximately eight square miles.

The district has one high school (Ridley High School), one middle school, and seven elementary schools:

- Amosland Elementary School
- Eddystone Elementary School
- Edgewood Elementary School
- Grace Park Elementary School
- Lakeview Elementary School
- Leedom Elementary School
- Woodlyn Elementary School

According to 2018-22 ACS-ED data, the district serves a resident population of 40,262. The median household income is $84,455, versus a state median income of $73,170, and national median income of $75,149.

== Extracurriculars ==
The district offers a variety of clubs, activities and sports. Ridley School District uses a Green Raider as their mascot. The Raiders referred to Native Americans from the Lenni Lenape Nation. In the summer of 2020, a movement organized by students at Ridley High School (called Diversify Our Narrative) took action to change the controversial mascot; however, they have yet to yield any results.

Ridley High School is home to the WRSD radio station.

In 1948 Ridley Township High School began borrowing a car from an area dealership for its driving training program, being the first high school in the region of Chester Pike to do this. Ridley Park High School later also started the dealership partner program.
