= Ridley Park, Pennsylvania =

Borough in Pennsylvania, US

Ridley Park, Pennsylvania Ridley
- Borough
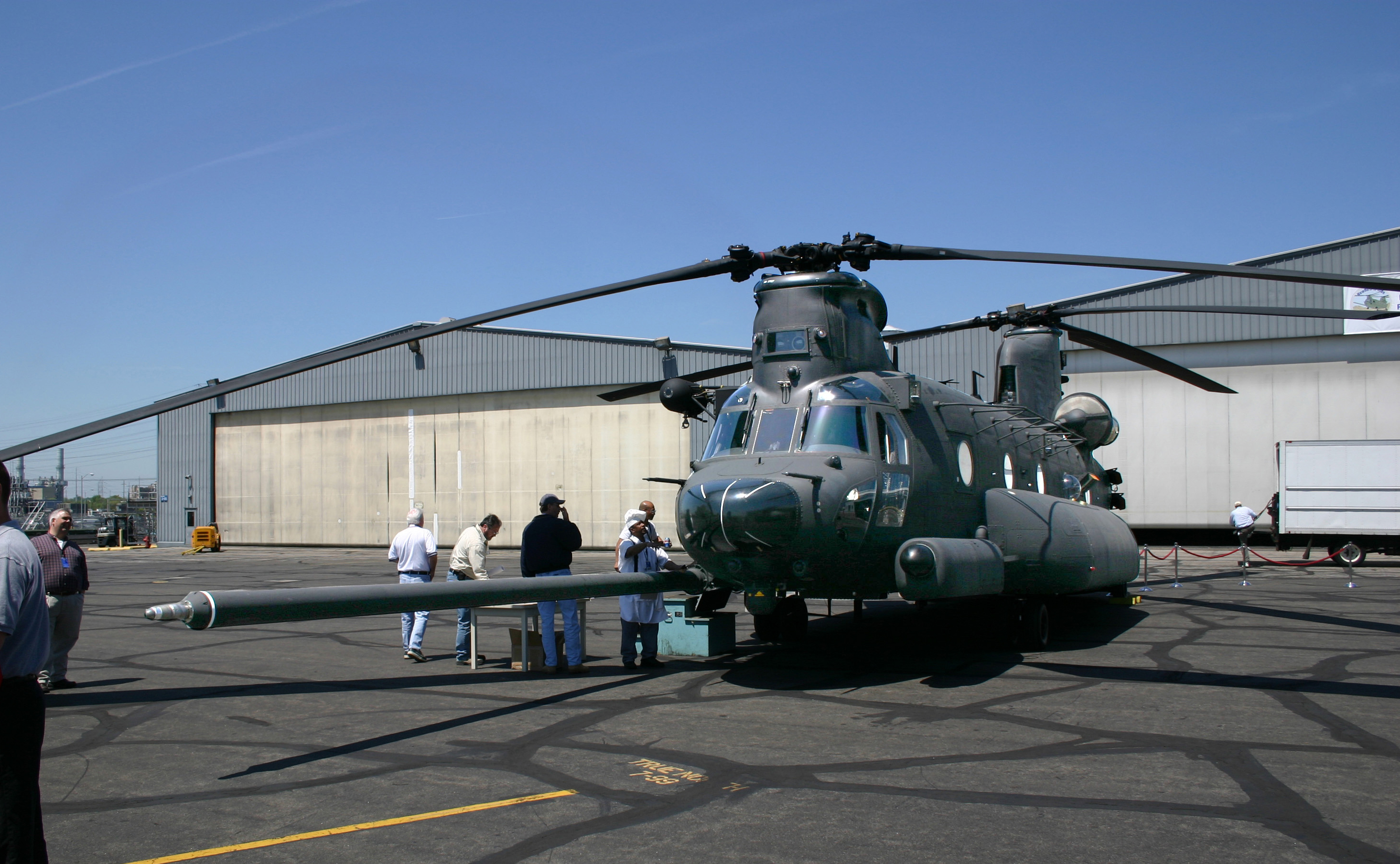
- MH-47G Chinook during the aircraft's rollout ceremony 6 May 2007 at Boeing in Ridley Park

- Location in Delaware County and the U.S. state of Pennsylvania

- Location in Pennsylvania Location in the United States
- Coordinates: 39°52′47″N 75°19′32″W
- Country: United States
- State: Pennsylvania
- County: Delaware

Government
  - Mayor: Hank Eberle Jr. (R)

Area
  - Total: 1.08 sq mi (2.81 km^{2})
  - Land: 1.08 sq mi (2.79 km^{2})
  - Water: 0.0039 sq mi (0.01 km^{2})
- Elevation: 89 ft (27 m)

Population (2020)
  - Total: 7,186
  - Density: 6,660.8/sq mi (2,571.75/km^{2})
- Time zone: UTC-5 (EST)
  - Summer (DST): UTC-4 (EDT)
- ZIP code: 19078
- Area codes: 610 and 484
- FIPS code: 42-64832
- Website: www.ridleyparkborough.org

Ridley Park is a borough in Delaware County, Pennsylvania, United States. As of the 2020 census, Ridley Park had a population of 7,186. Ridley Park is the home of Boeing's CH-47 Chinook helicopter division.

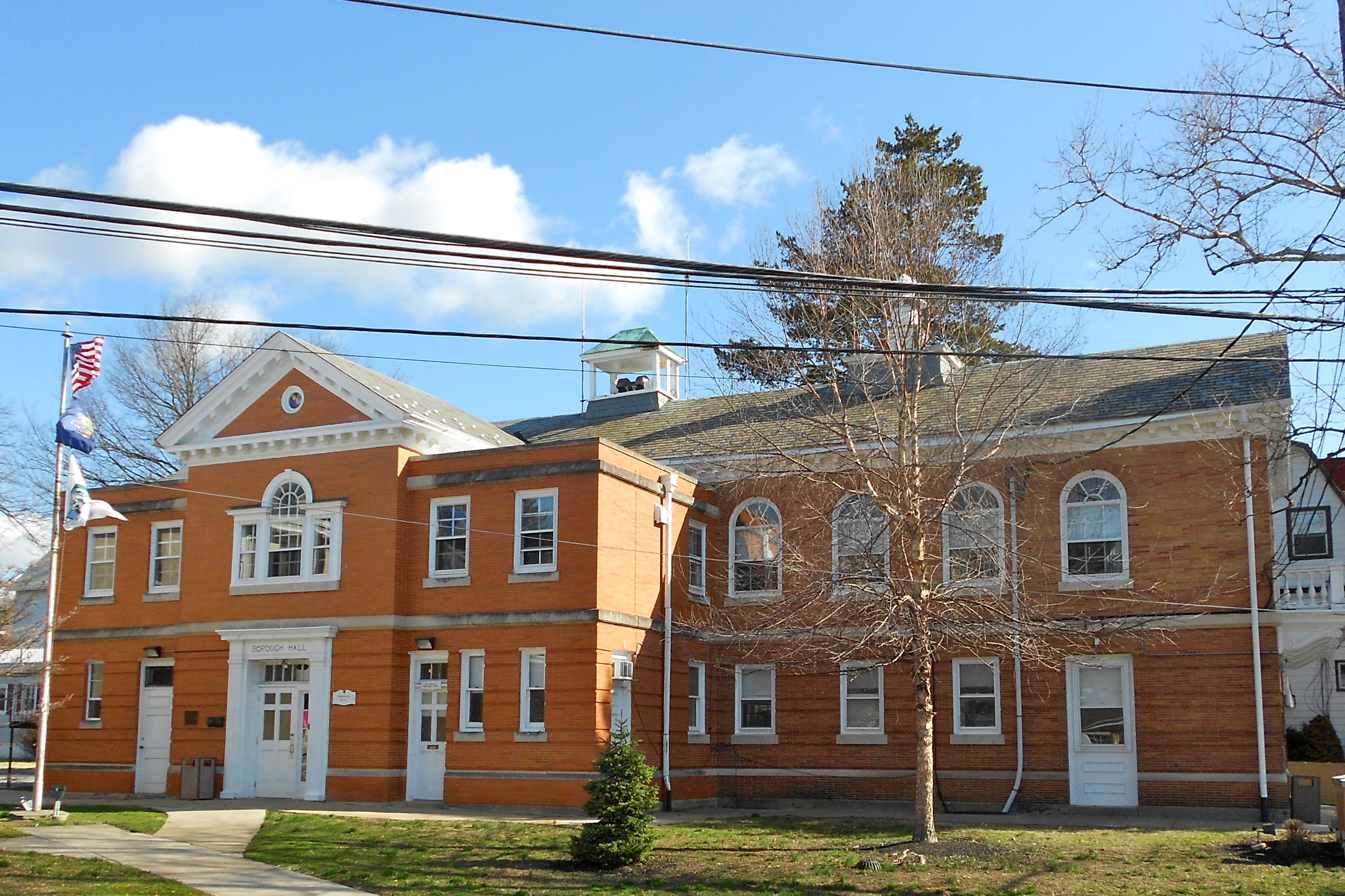
Ridley Park Borough Hall

== History ==
=== Native American ===
The Lenape inhabited the Delaware River region several centuries before the arrival of European explorers and traders. The Okehocking Tribe of the Lenni Lenape Nation established small permanent villages along the river and its main tributaries. Land adjacent to Stoney Creek in Ridley Township has been identified as a Native American town site. Historians also believe that additional villages may have existed at other locations along Stoney Creek and Crum Creek in Ridley Park. Native Americans influenced the built environment significantly through a network of paths laid out for travel and communication purposes. Their footpaths through the densely forested countryside grew into the first roads of the area. Chester Pike is believed to have developed from a footpath created by the Lenni Lenape as their main thoroughfare in the area.

=== Colonial ===
The borough is named after a place in Cheshire, England. John Morton, signer of the American Declaration of Independence, was born and raised in a log cabin adjacent to East Ridley Avenue. He later replaced the cabin with a brick house and began farming 133 acres (0.54 km^{2}) in the Ridley Park area. Chester Pike, originally a footpath, was realigned and widened by William Penn. Known then as the “Queens Highway,” it was one of the region's first roads stretching from Chester to Darby, and by 1715, it reached Philadelphia. General George Washington led his troops down this earthen road to Wilmington and eventually to Brandywine to confront the British in 1777. In 1799, the “Queens Highway” was improved as a plank road, and tolls were levied. The population of the area continued to increase after the American Revolutionary War. Consequently, a private elementary subscription school was founded in 1800 on a site at Chester Pike and Myrtle Avenue. This was one of the first schools in Delaware County.

=== Railroad suburb ===
Ridley Park was founded by Isaac Hinckley in 1871. He was the President of the Philadelphia, Wilmington and Baltimore Railroad. He wanted to expand the company's rail line to gain more business in the same way the Pennsylvania Railroad had earlier created a Main Line from 30th Street Station in Philadelphia to Paoli. The Pennsylvania Railroad bought up farmland and developed towns all along its rail line. City dwellers, seeking relief from the urban crowds with their potential to spread malaria, a disease that was a major health concern at the time, quickly purchased the new homes being built.

Seeing the success of this, Hinckley came up with the idea of putting in a rail line that would pass through Darby and continue all the way to the semi-rural city of Chester in what became known as the Darby Improvement. Hinckley's plans were met with initial resistance from farmers, and at the end of the first year, he had managed to buy only one farm. Undaunted, he traveled further south on Chester Pike to the area now known as Ridley Park.

In an effort to avoid his previous bad experience, in May 1871, Hinckley formed an association to acquire the land. Hinckley hired Robert Morris Copeland, a noted Boston landscape architect, to develop a master plan for a suburban park community which became known as the Borough of Ridley Park. Copeland's design is Delaware County's first planned community. Because of its beautifully landscaped streets and parks, and its 20-acre (81,000 m^{2}) man-made lake, Ridley Park became popular in the late 19th century and early part of the 20th century as a summer resort for wealthy Philadelphians who built most of the Victorian style homes still lived in today.

Between January and May 1870, many farms were purchased. The streets in the new development were named after the families who sold their farmland. Names such as Burk, Dutton, Free, Henderson, Stewart and Ward, are still used today. The first train of passengers-cars stopped at Ridley Park on October 19, 1872. By that time, the town had a hotel, and a dam had been built across Crum Creek, creating a 20-acre (81,000 m^{2}) lake. By 1880, the U.S. census return recorded the population of Ridley Park as 439. The railroad was, and continues today to be an integral part of the town.

== Geography ==
Ridley Park is located at 39°52′47″N 75°19′32″W (39.879631, -75.325482).

According to the United States Census Bureau, the borough has a total area of 1.1 square miles (2.8 km^{2}), of which 1.1 square miles (2.8 km^{2}) is land and 0.93% is water. It has a humid subtropical climate (Cfa) and average monthly temperatures range from 33.4 °F in January to 78.2 °F in July. PRISM Group at Oregon State University The hardiness zone is 7b. 2023 USDA Plant Hardiness Zone Map | USDA Plant Hardiness Zone Map

== Demographics ==
Historical population
Census	Pop.	Note	%±
1880	439		—
1900	1,234		—
1910	1,761		42.7%
1920	2,313		31.3%
1930	3,356		45.1%
1940	3,887		15.8%
1950	4,921		26.6%
1960	7,387		50.1%
1970	9,025		22.2%
1980	7,889		−12.6%
1990	7,592		−3.8%
2000	7,196		−5.2%
2010	7,002		−2.7%
2020	7,186		2.6%

As of Census 2010, the racial makeup of the borough was 95.3% White, 2.0% African American, 0.1% Native American, 1.2% Asian, 0.3% from other races, and 1.1% from two or more races. Hispanic or Latino of any race were 1.4% of the population Population and Housing Unit Estimates Tables.

As of the census of 2000, there were 7,196 people, 3,015 households, and 1,890 families residing in the borough. The population density was 6,749.6 inhabitants per square mile (2,606.0/km^{2}). There were 3,167 housing units at an average density of 2,970.5 per square mile (1,146.9/km^{2}). The racial makeup of the borough was 92.91% White, 4.64% African American, 0.01% Native American, 1.47% Asian, 0.03% Pacific Islander, 0.21% from other races, and 0.72% from two or more races. Hispanic or Latino of any race were 0.50% of the population.

There were 3,015 households, out of which 25.7% had children under the age of 18 living with them, 49.3% were married couples living together, 9.9% had a female householder with no husband present, and 37.3% were non-families. 33.0% of all households were made up of individuals, and 13.8% had someone living alone who was 65 years of age or older. The average household size was 2.36 and the average family size was 3.06.

In the borough, the population was spread out, with 21.4% under the age of 18, 7.0% from 18 to 24, 29.9% from 25 to 44, 22.3% from 45 to 64, and 19.4% who were 65 years of age or older. The median age was 40 years. For every 100 females there were 90.7 males. For every 100 females age 18 and over, there were 87.0 males.

The median income for a household in the borough was $50,065, and the median income for a family was $62,378. Males had a median income of $43,201 versus $31,824 for females. The per capita income for the borough was $23,806. About 2.9% of families and 4.2% of the population were below the poverty line, including 2.3% of those under age 18 and 6.7% of those age 65 or over.

== Economy ==
Corporate headquarters include:

- The Boeing Company, has a headquarters for its Vertical Lift Division in Ridley Park, Pennsylvania. This location is a major manufacturing center used for vertical lift aircraft restoration. This location employs more than 4,000 people in the area.

== Transportation ==
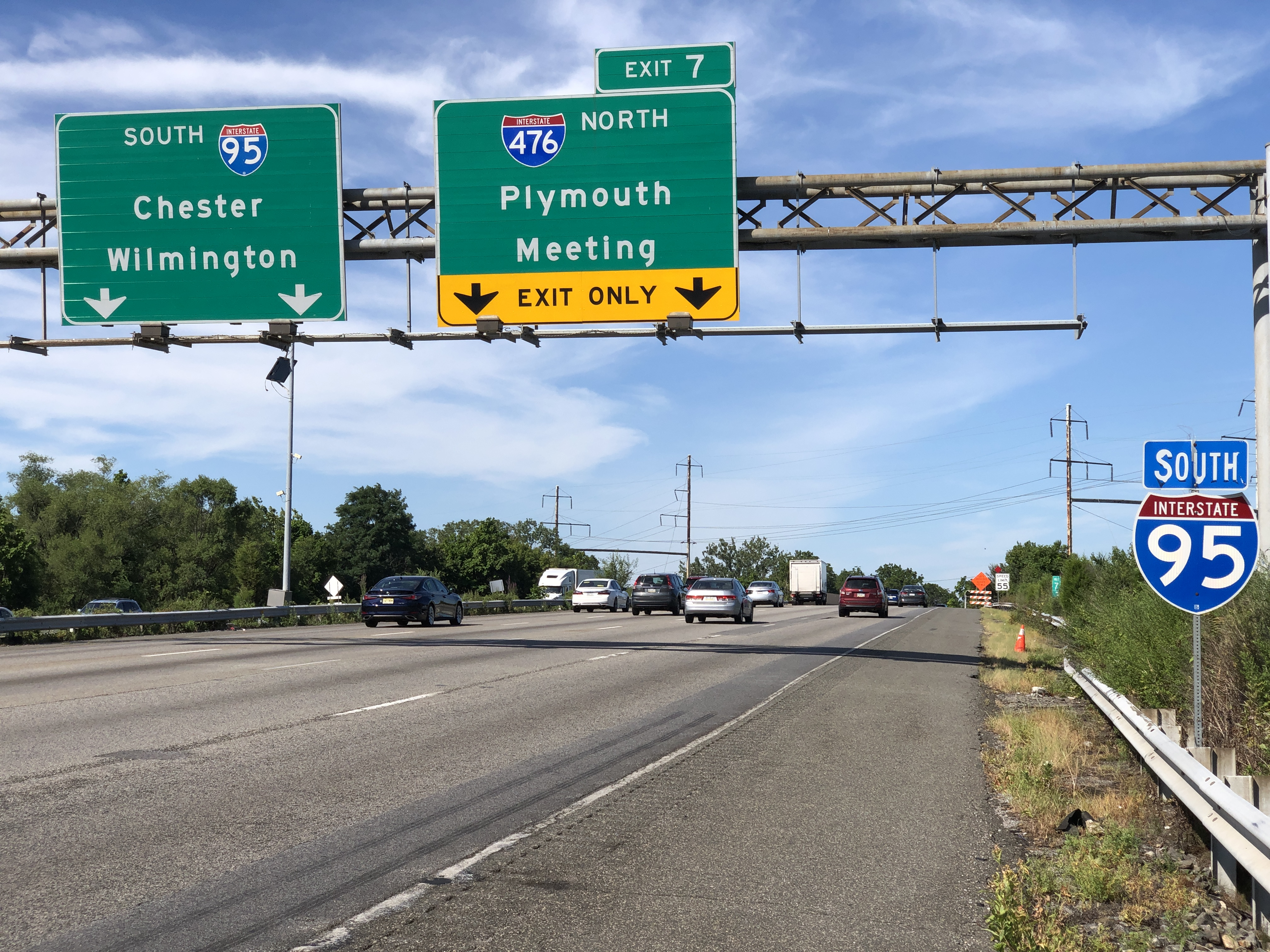
I-95 southbound in Ridley Park

As of 2009, there were 20.87 miles (33.59 km) of public roads in Ridley Park, of which 4.42 miles (7.11 km) were maintained by the Pennsylvania Department of Transportation (PennDOT) and 16.45 miles (26.47 km) were maintained by the borough.

Interstate 95 is the main highway serving the borough, with exit 8 serving Ridley Park directly. Chester Pike (U.S. Route 13), also passes through the borough. Both highways connect the borough with Philadelphia and Chester.

Ridley Park station is a SEPTA train station on the Wilmington/Newark Line.

== Education ==
=== Primary and secondary schools ===
==== Public schools ====
The borough is served by the Ridley School District. It consists of Ridley Township, and the boroughs of Ridley Park and Eddystone. The district has one high school, one middle school, and seven elementary schools. At all levels, the schools use the Green Raiders as their mascot. While originally the Raiders referred to Native Americans from the Lenni Lenape Nation, the district has ceased use of most material relating to the tribe. Ridley High School is home to the WRSD radio station.

==== Parochial schools ====
The St. James Regional, formerly St. Madeline-St. Rose School, serves grades 1st through 8. Originally, these were two separate parishes but in 1993, with declining enrollments, the Archdiocese of Philadelphia consolidated the St. Madeline Parish in Ridley Park, and the St. Rose of Lima Parish in nearby Eddystone. The Archdiocese had an area wide consolidation of schools due to declining enrollment. The school is now called St. James Regional School after combining with St. Gabriel's in Norwood in 2012. The name originated from the former St. James High School for Boys in Chester. The St. James High alumni association suggested the name, and the new school asked to use not only the name but also the mascot and colors. When it opened it had 402 students, with around 201 being from St. Gabriel.

Cardinal O'Hara High School, serving grades 9 through 12, is a coeducational school located in Springfield, and serves the Ridley Park, Chester, Swarthmore, and Springfield area.

== Religion ==
The Roman Catholic Archdiocese of Philadelphia operates Catholic churches in Delaware County. St. Madeline Church, established in 1908, is in Ridley Park. The number of parishioners decreased by 20% from 2008 to 2012, with 4,720 congregants in the latter year. Christ Church, Ridley Park is an Episcopal Church in the Diocese of Pennsylvania, founded in 1879.

== In popular culture ==
The 2012 movie Silver Linings Playbook takes place in and around Ridley Park, which is credited at the end of the film. While the community is not specifically mentioned in the script, a police officer can be seen wearing the initials "RPPD" on his collar.

== Notable people ==
- Henry W. Buse Jr., Lieutenant general in the Marine Corps
- Joseph Dorsey, Pennsylvania State Representative for the 162nd district (1967-1974)
- Joseph T. Doyle, Pennsylvania State Representative for the 163rd district (1971-1978)
- Bill Foster, Duke University basketball coach
- Joe Frantz, filmmaker, director, producer, cinematographer, author, orator and member of Bam Margera's CKY Crew
- Jim Goad, author
- Walter Francis Layer, Pennsylvania State Representative for Delaware County (1947-1948), U.S. Marine colonel
- John Mecray, marine artist
- Scott Douglas Miller, President of Batten University, former president of Bethany College, Wesley College, and Lincoln Memorial University
- Brett Moyer, professional lacrosse player
- Bob Rigby, professional soccer player, member of United States men's national soccer team
- Matthew J. Ryan, Pennsylvania politician; namesake of the state's Capitol Annex and University of Pennsylvania veterinary hospital
- Gerald J. Spitz, Pennsylvania State Representative for the 162nd district (1977-1984)
- Daniel M. Tani, NASA astronaut who worked on the International Space Station
- Jim Beard, Steely Dan Keyboardist
