= Ridley Township, Pennsylvania =

Township in Pennsylvania, US

- Township
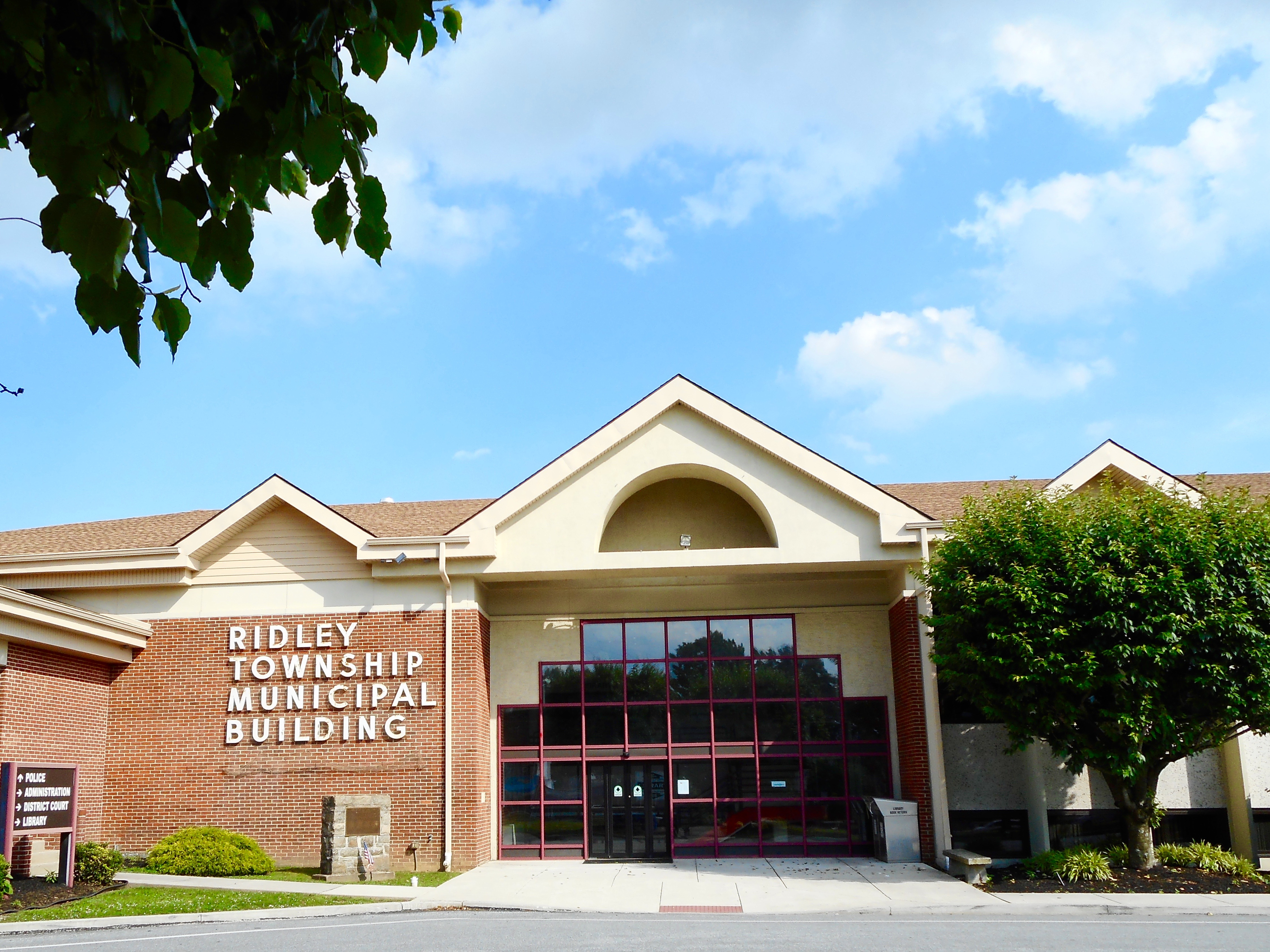
- Township municipal building and library

- Location in Delaware County and the state of Pennsylvania.

- Location of Pennsylvania in the United States
- Coordinates: 39°53′30″N 75°19′59″W
- Country: United States
- State: Pennsylvania
- County: Delaware
- Incorporation: 1687

Area
  - Total: 5.31 sq mi (13.74 km^{2})
  - Land: 5.12 sq mi (13.25 km^{2})
  - Water: 0.19 sq mi (0.49 km^{2})
- Elevation: 102 ft (31 m)

Population (2010)
  - Total: 30,768
  - Estimate (2016): 31,038
  - Density: 6,065.0/sq mi (2,341.71/km^{2})
- Time zone: UTC-5 (EST)
  - Summer (DST): UTC-4 (EDT)
- Area code: 610
- FIPS code: 42-045-64800
- GNIS feature ID: 1216390
- Website: www.ridleytwp.org

Ridley Township is a township in Delaware County, Pennsylvania, United States. The population was 30,768 at the 2010 census. Ridley Township contains the (CDPs) of Folsom and Woodlyn, along with the unincorporated communities of Crum Lynne and Holmes and a portion of Morton and Secane.

== History ==
Ridley Township derives its name from Ridley, Cheshire, England, from where John Simcock, one of the original settlers, emigrated. The first mention of Ridley in court records is from 1684 when tax collectors were appointed for the township.

During the Revolutionary War, Ridley was traversed by both the Continental Army and the British Army. George Washington moved his troops through Ridley Township on his way to Wilmington, Delaware to oppose General Howe. After the Battle of Brandywine, Continental Army soldiers camped along the road in Ridley and George Washington spent the night in the home of John McIlvain. On November 19, 1777, General Cornwallis marched 3,000 men from Philadelphia through Ridley township. It was reported that the "men robbed the inoffensive people on the route without mercy, taking food from the indigent widow as remorselessly from the wealthy husbandman." On December 22, 1777, General Howe and troops passed through Ridley on their raid to and beyond Darby.

== Geography ==
Ridley Township is in southeastern Delaware County, northeast of Chester and southeast of Media, the county seat. The borough of Rutledge is in the northern part of the township but is a separate municipality. The unincorporated communities of Folsom, Secane and Woodlyn occupy the central and western parts of the township, respectively.

According to the U.S. Census Bureau, the township has a total area of 5.3 square miles (13.8 km^{2}), of which 5.1 square miles (13.3 km^{2}) is land and 0.19 square miles (0.5 km^{2}), or 3.61%, is water. Most of the water area is in the Delaware River in the southernmost part of the township.

Ridley Township has a humid subtropical climate (Cfa.) Its hardiness zone is 7b except close enough to the Delaware River where it is 8a. This is the northernmost occurrence of 8a on the eastern North American mainland.

=== Adjacent municipalities ===
- Springfield Township, Delaware County - north
- Morton, Delaware County - north
- Upper Darby Township, Delaware County - northeast
- Darby Township, Delaware County - east
- Glenolden Borough, Delaware County - east
- Norwood Borough, Delaware County - east
- Prospect Park Borough, Delaware County - east
- Ridley Park Borough, Delaware County - surrounded on three sides by Ridley Township
- Tinicum Township, Delaware County - south
- Greenwich Township, Gloucester County, New Jersey - south
- Eddystone Borough, Delaware County - south
- City of Chester, Delaware County - southwest
- Nether Providence Township, Delaware County - southwest
- Swarthmore Borough, Delaware County - northwest
- Rutledge Borough, Delaware County - completely surrounded by Ridley Township

== Demographics ==
Historical population
Census	Pop.	Note	%±
1930	8,326		—
1940	8,641		3.8%
1950	17,212		99.2%
1960	35,738		107.6%
1970	39,085		9.4%
1980	33,771		−13.6%
1990	31,169		−7.7%
2000	30,791		−1.2%
2010	30,768		−0.1%
2020	31,053		0.9%

As of 2010 census, the racial makeup of the township was 90.0% White, 5.7% African American, 0.1% Native American, 2.2% Asian, 0.5% from other races, and 1.4% from two or more races. Hispanic or Latino of any race were 1.9% of the population.

As of the census of 2000, there were 30,791 people, 12,121 households, and 8,218 families residing in the township. The population density was 6,075.9 inhabitants per square mile (2,345.9/km^{2}). There were 12,544 housing units at an average density of 2,475.3 units per square mile (955.7 units/km^{2}). The racial makeup of the township was 96.97% White, 0.26% African American, 0.07% Native American, 1.64% Asian, 0.05% Pacific Islander, 0.21% from other races, and 0.80% from two or more races. Hispanic or Latino of any race were 0.92% of the population.

There were 12,121 households, out of which 30.2% had children under the age of 18 living with them, 52.3% were married couples living together, 11.7% had a female householder with no husband present, and 32.2% were non-families. 28.0% of all households were made up of individuals, and 12.9% had someone living alone who was 65 years of age or older. The average household size was 2.54 and the average family size was 3.14.

In the township, the population was spread out, with 24.4% under the age of 18, 7.1% from 18 to 24, 30.3% from 25 to 44, 21.0% from 45 to 64, and 17.2% who were 65 years of age or older. The median age was 38 years. For every 100 females, there were 92.4 males. For every 100 females age 18 and over, there were 88.0 males.

The median income for a household in the township was $45,918, and the median income for a family was $54,581. Males had a median income of $41,504 versus $29,972 for females. The per capita income for the township was $21,437. About 5.0% of families and 6.7% of the population were below the poverty line, including 8.0% of those under age 18 and 9.0% of those age 65 or over.

== Education ==
Students residing within the township generally attend schools within the Ridley School District.

The Roman Catholic Archdiocese of Philadelphia is responsible for Catholic schools. Our Lady of Angels Regional School in Ridley Township (Morton postal address) is the area Catholic school. It formed in 2012 from a merger of Our Lady of Fatima in Secane and in Ridley Township, and Our Lady of Perpetual Help in Ridley Township. In 2012 it had about 503 students, with 215 originating from Our Lady of Fatima. In 2018, as a fire had affected the classroom area, the students were temporarily housed at Cardinal O'Hara. The Ridley School District provided transportation. By 2019 there were 315 students, and the school was being rebuilt.

== Transportation ==
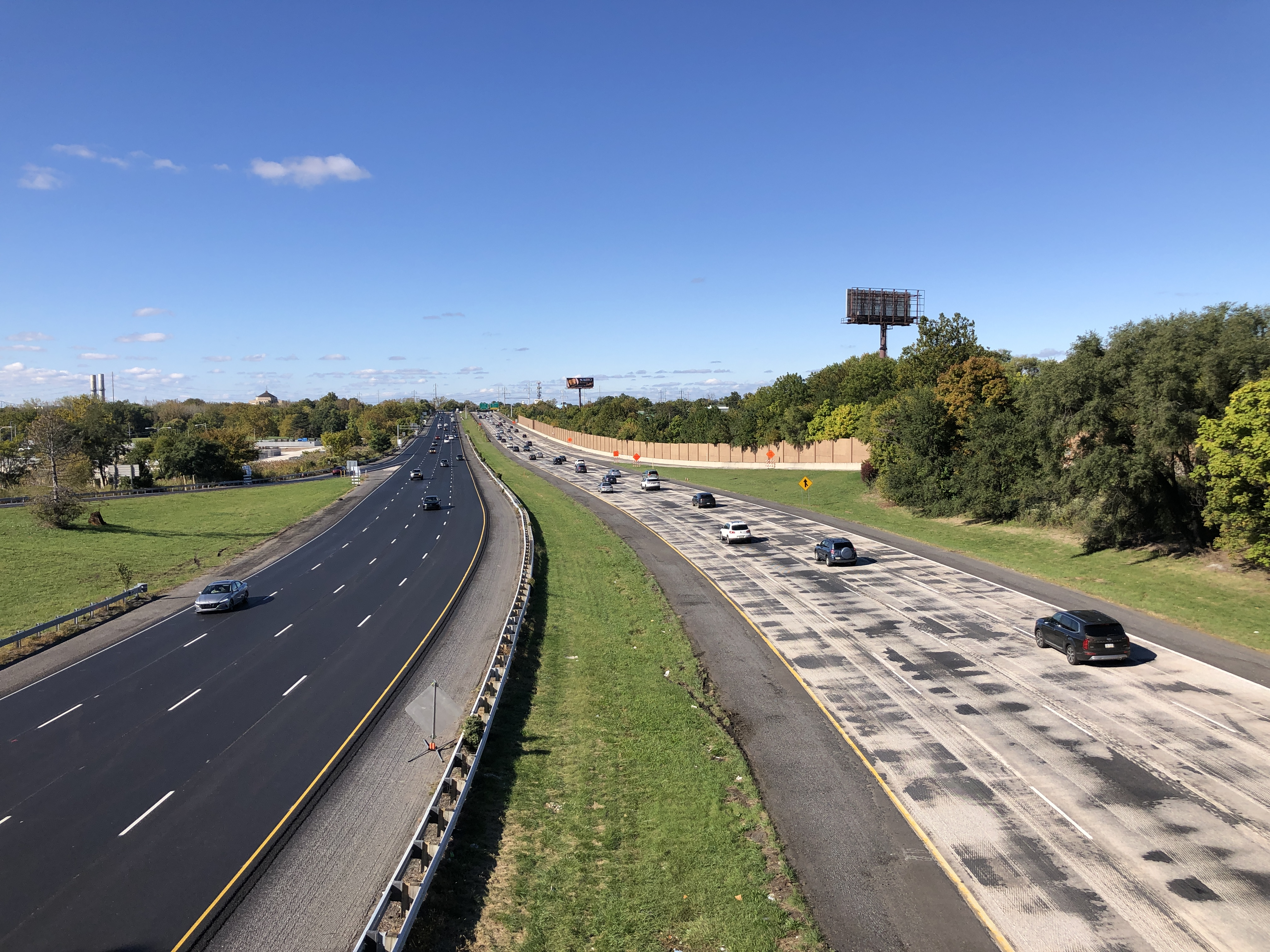
I-95 southbound in Ridley Township

As of 2022, there were 86.24 miles (138.79 km) of public roads in Ridley Township, of which 13.93 miles (22.42 km) were maintained by Pennsylvania Department of Transportation (PennDOT) and 72.31 miles (116.37 km) were maintained by the township.

Interstate 95 is the most prominent highway serving Ridley Township. It follows the Delaware Expressway on an east–west alignment across the southern portion of the township. Interstate 476 heads northwest from its terminus at I-95 across the southwestern portion of the township. U.S. Route 13 follows the Chester Pike along a southwest–northeast alignment across the southern portion of the township. Pennsylvania Route 291 follows Industrial Highway along a southwest–northeast alignment through the southeastern corner of the township. Finally, Pennsylvania Route 420 follows Kedron Avenue along a northwest–southeast alignment through the northeastern portion of the township.

SEPTA provides bus service to Ridley Township along City Bus Route 37, which runs between the Chester Transit Center and South Philadelphia via the Philadelphia International Airport, Suburban Bus Route 113, which runs between Claymont station in Claymont, Delaware, and the 69th Street Transportation Center, and Suburban Bus Route 114, which runs between Wawa Station and the Darby Transit Center. SEPTA Regional Rail's Media/Wawa Line briefly passes through the northern portion of the township while SEPTA Regional Rail's Wilmington/Newark Line that follows Amtrak's Northeast Corridor briefly passes through the southern portion of the township; however, the nearest train stations are in neighboring municipalities.

== Communities ==
Ridley Township encompasses the following towns and communities, which are all part of the township, and are known by locals as Ridley, as they share the same taxes, school district, library, police department located in Folsom. Many of these communities, however, all own their own fire department, though they occasionally serve each other with a serious fire, or other major event.

- Crum Lynne
- Folsom
- Holmes
- Leedom
- Milmont Park
- Secane
- Swarthmorewood
- Woodlyn

== Notable people ==
- David Reese Esrey, businessman and banker
- Paul Felder, UFC Lightweight and former CFFC Lightweight Champion
- Ethel Gabriel, record producer and executive
- Joe Hackett, member of the Pennsylvania House of Representatives, District 161 from 2011 to 2015
- George Gray Leiper, United States Congressman
- Bill McGlone, professional lacrosse player
- James McKinney, U.S. representative from Illinois
- John Morton, politician, signer of United States Declaration of Independence
- Steve Pulcinella, powerlifter and strongman
- Dave Schulthise, bass player for The Dead Milkmen
- George Trosley, cartoonist
- Joe Valerio, Former NFL football player, Kansas City Chiefs
- Hack Wilson, Major League Baseball player, single season all time RBI leader(191), in 1930, Chicago Cubs
- William P. Worrall, Pennsylvania State Representative for Delaware County from 1875 to 1876
