= Folsom, Pennsylvania =

Unincorporated community in Pennsylvania, US

- Census-designated place
- Location in Delaware County and the U.S. state of Pennsylvania
- Coordinates: 39°53′31″N 75°19′34″W
- Country: United States
- State: Pennsylvania
- County: Delaware
- Township: Ridley

Area
  - Total: 1.25 sq mi (3.24 km^{2})
  - Land: 1.25 sq mi (3.24 km^{2})
  - Water: 0 sq mi (0.00 km^{2})
- Elevation: 102 ft (31 m)

Population (2020)
  - Total: 8,287
  - Density: 6,631.5/sq mi (2,560.45/km^{2})
- Time zone: UTC-5 (EST)
  - Summer (DST): UTC-4 (EDT)
- ZIP code: 19033
- Area codes: 610 and 484
- FIPS code: 42-26432

Folsom is a census-designated place (CDP) in Delaware County, Pennsylvania, United States. It is part of Ridley Township. The population was 8,323 at the 2010 census.

== Geography ==
Folsom is located in northern Ridley Township at 39°53′31″N 75°19′34″W (39.891978, -75.326231). It is bordered to the northwest by the borough of Swarthmore, to the north by Springfield Township and the borough of Rutledge, to the east by Pennsylvania Route 420, to the southeast by the borough of Prospect Park, to the south by the borough of Ridley Park, and to the southwest by Woodlyn in Ridley Township. Folsom is 11 miles (18 km) southwest of Center City, Philadelphia.

According to the United States Census Bureau, the Folsom CDP has a total area of 1.2 square miles (3.2 km^{2}), all land.

== Demographics ==
Historical population
Census	Pop.	Note	%±
2000	8,072		—
2010	8,323		3.1%
2020	8,287		−0.4%

As of the census of 2000, there were 8,072 people, 3,162 households, and 2,203 families residing in the CDP. The population density was 6,455.1 inhabitants per square mile (2,492.3/km^{2}). There were 3,235 housing units at an average density of 2,587.0 per square mile (998.8/km^{2}). The racial makeup of the CDP was 96.51% White, 1.83% African American, 0.01% Native American, 1.07% Asian, 0.11% from other races, and 0.47% from two or more races. Hispanic or Latino of any race were 0.59% of the population.

There were 3,162 households, out of which 28.6% had children under the age of 18 living with them, 56.6% were married couples living together, 9.7% had a female householder with no husband present, and 30.3% were non-families. 26.4% of all households were made up of individuals, and 13.8% had someone living alone who was 65 years of age or older. The average household size was 2.55 and the average family size was 3.12.

In the CDP, the population was spread out, with 22.8% under the age of 18, 7.0% from 18 to 24, 29.1% from 25 to 44, 21.2% from 45 to 64, and 19.9% who were 65 years of age or older. The median age was 40 years. For every 100 females, there were 91.5 males. For every 100 females age 18 and over, there were 88.1 males.

The median income for a household in the CDP was $50,750, and the median income for a family was $63,405. Males had a median income of $46,938 versus $30,789 for females. The per capita income for the CDP was $23,131. About 2.1% of families and 3.5% of the population were below the poverty line, including 2.8% of those under age 18 and 5.8% of those age 65 or over.

== Schools ==
The school district is the Ridley School District.

Folsom is home to two of the district's nine schools: Ridley High School and Edgewood Elementary School. Edgewood is located at 525 8th Avenue in residential Folsom; while Ridley High School is located on one of Folsom's busier roads at 901 Morton Avenue.

== Wawa ==
The first Wawa convenience store, opened on April 16, 1964, was located in Folsom at the intersection of MacDade Boulevard and Swarthmore Avenue, and closed on June 27, 2016, in favor of a "super Wawa" that opened down the street. A parade was held from the original Wawa to the new location.
