= Cardinal O'Hara High School (Springfield, Pennsylvania) =

Private school in Marple, Pennsylvania, United States

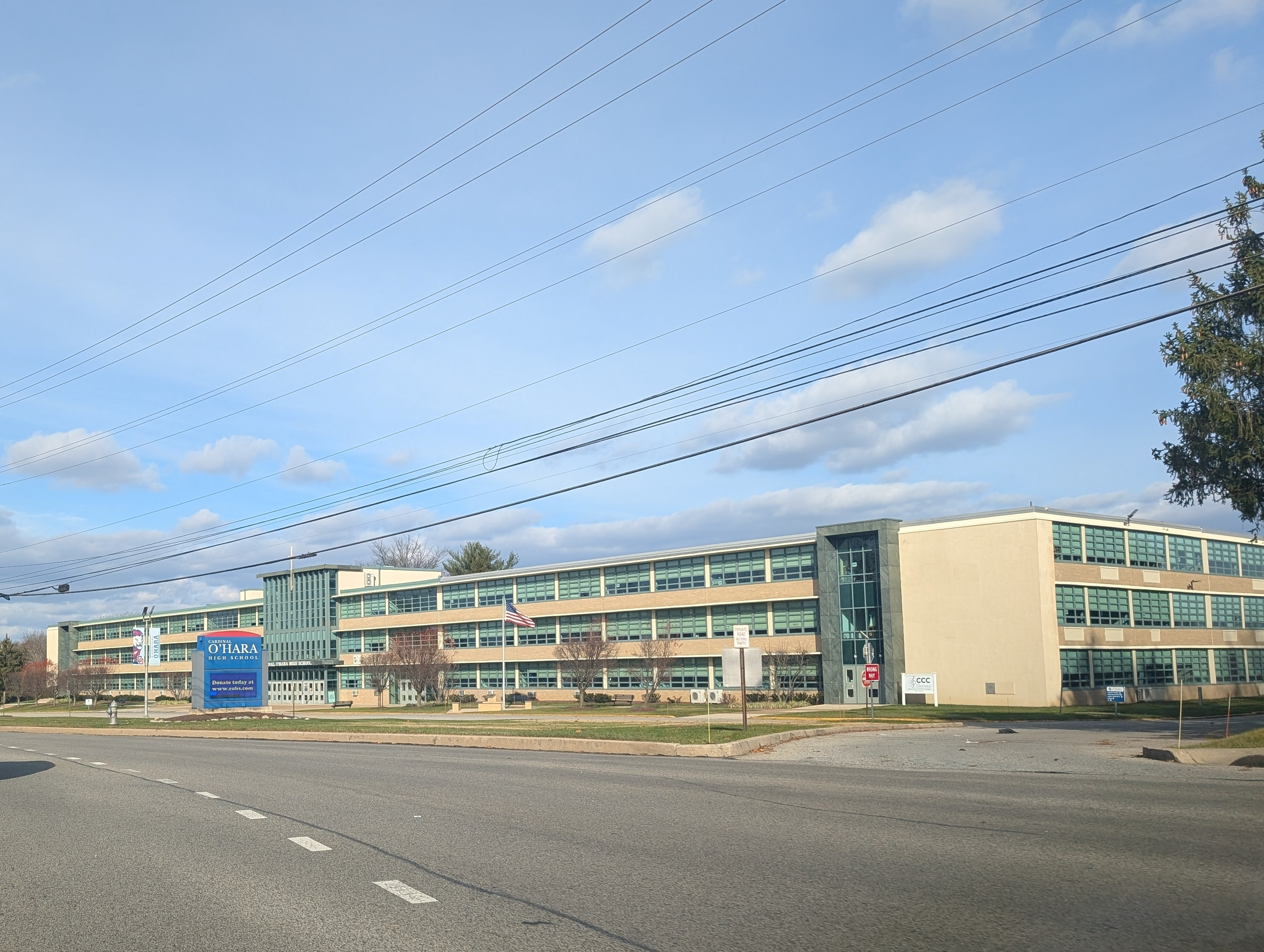
- Front of the school on PA 320

Location
- 1701 South Sproul Road; Marple, (Delaware County), Pennsylvania 19064; United States; 39°56′51.271″N 75°20′53.402″W

Information
- Type: Private, Coeducational
- Motto: Ipsam sequens non devias (Following her, you will not go astray)
- Religious affiliation: Roman Catholic
- Established: 1963
- President: Mike Connor
- Principal: Eileen Murphy
- Chaplain: Rev. Kenneth Omeke
- Teaching staff: 41.4 (on an FTE basis)
- Grades: 9–12
- Enrollment: 829 (2019–2020)
- Student to teacher ratio: 20.0
- Colors: Cardinal Red and Navy Blue
- Slogan: Pride, Excellence, Tradition
- Song: "Alma Mater"
- Athletics conference: Philadelphia Catholic League (PCL)
- Mascot: The Lion
- Team name: The Lions
- Accreditation: Middle States Association of Colleges and Schools
- Newspaper: The O'Herald
- Yearbook: Coeur de Lion
- Tuition: $10,800
- Television Station: WCOH (Wake-Up Cardinal O'Hara)
- Website: http://www.cohs.com

Cardinal O'Hara High School is a coeducational Catholic high school of the Archdiocese of Philadelphia. The school is named after John Francis O'Hara who was Roman Catholic Archbishop of Philadelphia from 1951 to 1960. It is located in Marple Township, Pennsylvania, and was officially opened for the first time in 1963.

== History ==
In 2018 the O'Hara campus began temporarily housing students from Our Lady of the Angels Regional School as that campus had experienced a fire.

== Administration ==
=== Presidents ===
The position of president was established in 1993 for all archdiocesan high schools. The president is responsible for financial operations, facilities issues, fund raising, alumni relations, and external affairs.

- 1993-2001: Joseph P. McFadden
- 2001-2014: William J. McCusker
- 2014-2017: Thomas Fertal
- 2017-2020: Gerald DeFruscio
- 2021–present times: Mike Connor

=== Principals ===
Since the establishment of the position of President in 1993, the principal's duties are concentrated on the day-to-day operations of the school.

- 1963-1969: Paul P. Maloney
- 1969-1971: Joseph C. McCloskey
- 1971-1980: James E. Mortimer
- 1980-1988: Philip J. Cribben
- 1988-1993: Joseph J. McLaughlin
- 1993-2001: William J. McCusker
- 2001-2004: Michael O'Malley
- 2004-2007: William J. Miles
- 2007-2010: George Stratts
- 2010-2013: Marie Rogai
- 2014-2015: Peter Balzano
- 2015-pres: Eileen Murphy

== Athletics ==
Baseball	Football	Swimming (Boys/Girls)	Volleyball
Basketball (Boys/Girls)	Golf	Tennis (Boys/Girls)	
Bowling (Boys/Girls)	Ice Hockey	Indoor Track (Boys/Girls)	
Cheerleading	Lacrosse (Boys/Girls)	Outdoor Track (Boys/Girls)	
Cross Country (Boys/Girls)	Soccer	Rugby	
Field Hockey	Softball	Ultimate Frisbee	

== Notable alumni ==
=== Sports ===
- Corey "Philly" Brown, NFL football player
- Kristen "Ace" Clement, former NCAA basketball player
- Don Clune, former NFL football player
- Joey Crawford, retired NBA referee
- Tim Donaghy, ex-NBA referee
- Gerald Feehery, retired NFL football player
- Theresa Grentz, basketball player, member of Women's Basketball Hall of Fame
- Anthony Heygood, former NFL football player
- Tom Ingelsby, former NBA player
- Kevin Jones, NFL football player
- John Kincade, sports talk radio personality
- Tom Savage, NFL football player, quarterback of Houston Texans
- Anthony Walters, NFL football player
- Natasha Cloud, WNBA Player for the Chicago Sky
- James O'Malley, hall of fame Delco Lycoming football player

=== Entertainment/TV/Film ===
- Mark Matkevich, stage, film, and television actor and artist

=== Military /Government/Religious ===
- Bill Adolph, member of Pennsylvania House of Representatives
- Michael Francis Burbidge, Bishop of Arlington, former Bishop of Raleigh
- Aerion Abney, member of Pennsylvania House of Representatives
- Joe Hackett, member of the Pennsylvania House of Representatives, District 161 from 2011 to 2015
- Ronald T. Kadish, retired United States Air Force Lieutenant General
- Julia Keleher Secretary of Education in Puerto Rico and writer
- Tom Killion, member of Pennsylvania House of Representatives
- Samuel Paparo, 64th commander, United States Pacific Fleet (2021–2024), 27th Commander, United States Indo-Pacific Command (2024-present)
- Joe Sestak, member of US House of Representatives for Pennsylvania's 7th congressional district

== See also ==
- Philadelphia Catholic League
- Roman Catholic Archdiocese of Philadelphia
