= Delaware County, Pennsylvania =

County in Pennsylvania, United States

- County
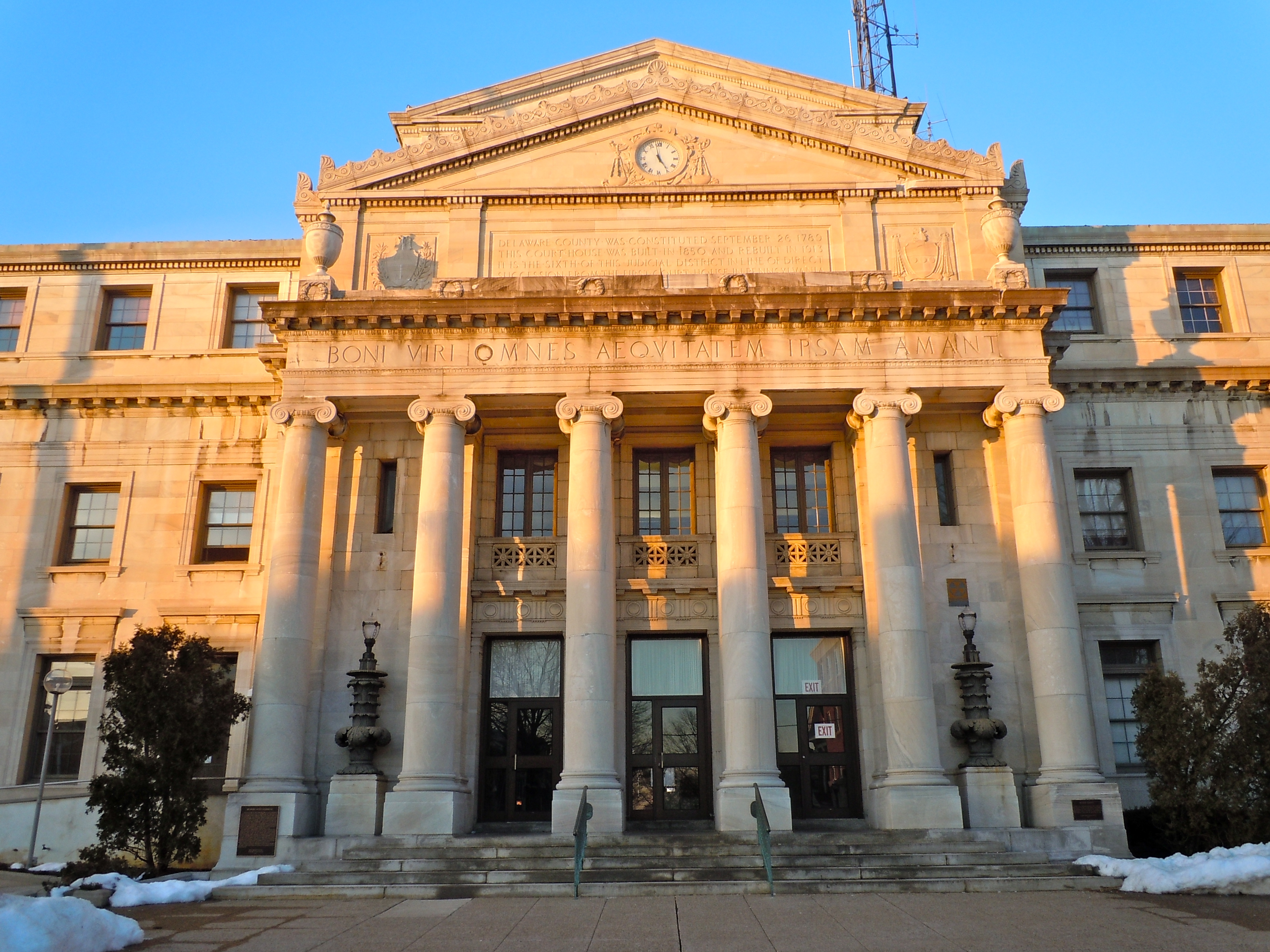
- Delaware County Courthouse in Media, Pennsylvania

- Flag Seal

- Location within the U.S. state of Pennsylvania
- Interactive map of Delaware County, Pennsylvania
- Coordinates: 39.92°N 75.40°W
- Country: United States
- State: Pennsylvania
- Founded: September 26, 1789
- Named for: Delaware River
- Seat: Media
- Largest Township: Upper Darby
- Other cities: Chester

Area
  - Total: 191 sq mi (490 km^{2})
  - Land: 184 sq mi (480 km^{2})
  - Water: 6.8 sq mi (18 km^{2}) 3.5%

Population (2020)
  - Total: 576,830
  - Estimate (2025): 580,937 ▲
  - Density: 3,130/sq mi (1,210/km^{2})
- Congressional district: 5th
- Website: delcopa.gov

Pennsylvania Historical Marker
- Designated: October 3, 1982

Delaware County, colloquially referred to as Delco, is in the Commonwealth of Pennsylvania. With a population of 576,830 as of the 2020 census, it is the fifth-most populous county in Pennsylvania and the third-smallest in area. The county was created on September 26, 1789, from part of Chester County and named for the Delaware River. The county is part of the Southeast region of the commonwealth. (Note: Includes Philadelphia, Montgomery, Bucks, Delaware, Chester, Lehigh and Northampton Counties)

Delaware County borders Philadelphia, the nation's sixth-most populous city, to its northeast. It also is adjacent to the city-county of Philadelphia County and is included in the Philadelphia–Camden–Wilmington, PA–NJ–DE–MD metropolitan statistical area. Its county seat is Media, which is located near the center of the county.

== History ==
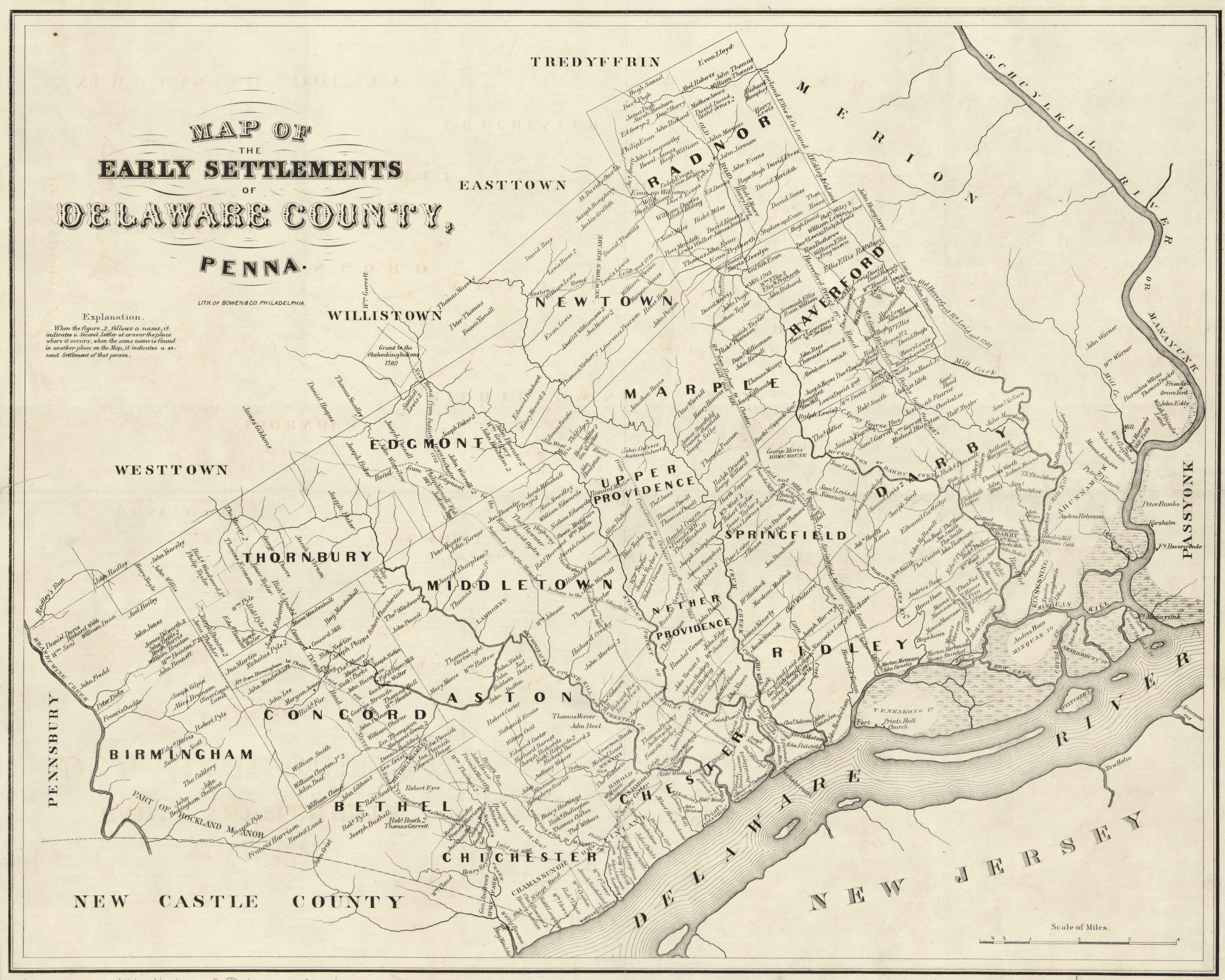
Map of the early settlements of Delaware County, Pennsylvania

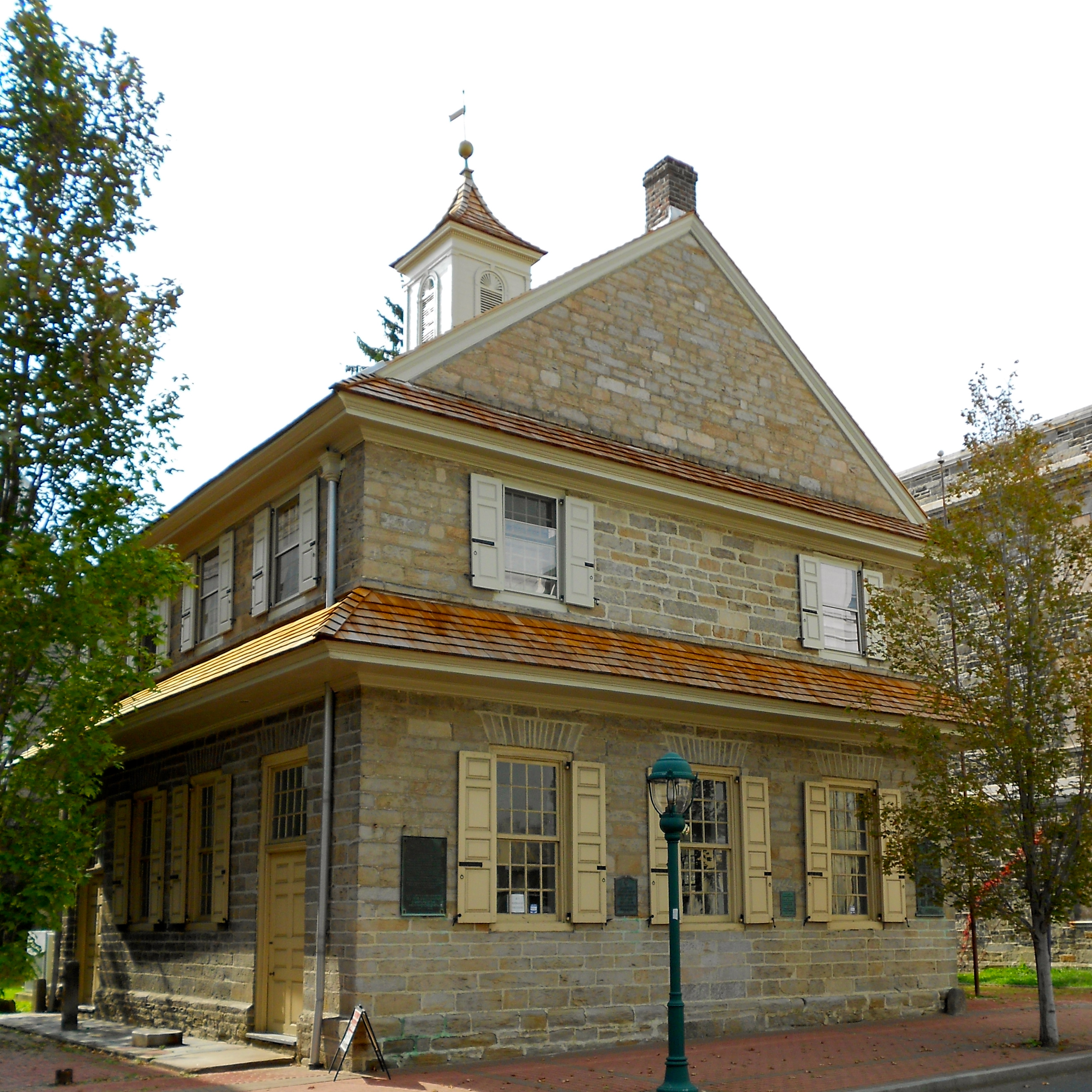
The old Chester Courthouse, built in 1724

Delaware County lies in the river and bay drainage area named "Delaware" in honor of Thomas West, 3rd Baron De La Warr, Governor of the nearby English colony of Virginia. The land was explored by Henry Hudson in 1609, and over the next several decades, was settled and variously claimed by the Swedes, the Dutch, and the English. Its original human inhabitants were the Lenape tribe of American Indians.

Once the Dutch were defeated and the extent of New York was determined, King Charles II of England made his grant to William Penn to found the colony which came to be named Pennsylvania. Penn divided his colony into three counties: Bucks, Philadelphia, and Chester. The riverfront land south of Philadelphia, being the most accessible, was quickly granted and settled. In 1789, the southeastern portion of Chester County was divided from the rest and named Delaware County for the Delaware River.

== Geography ==
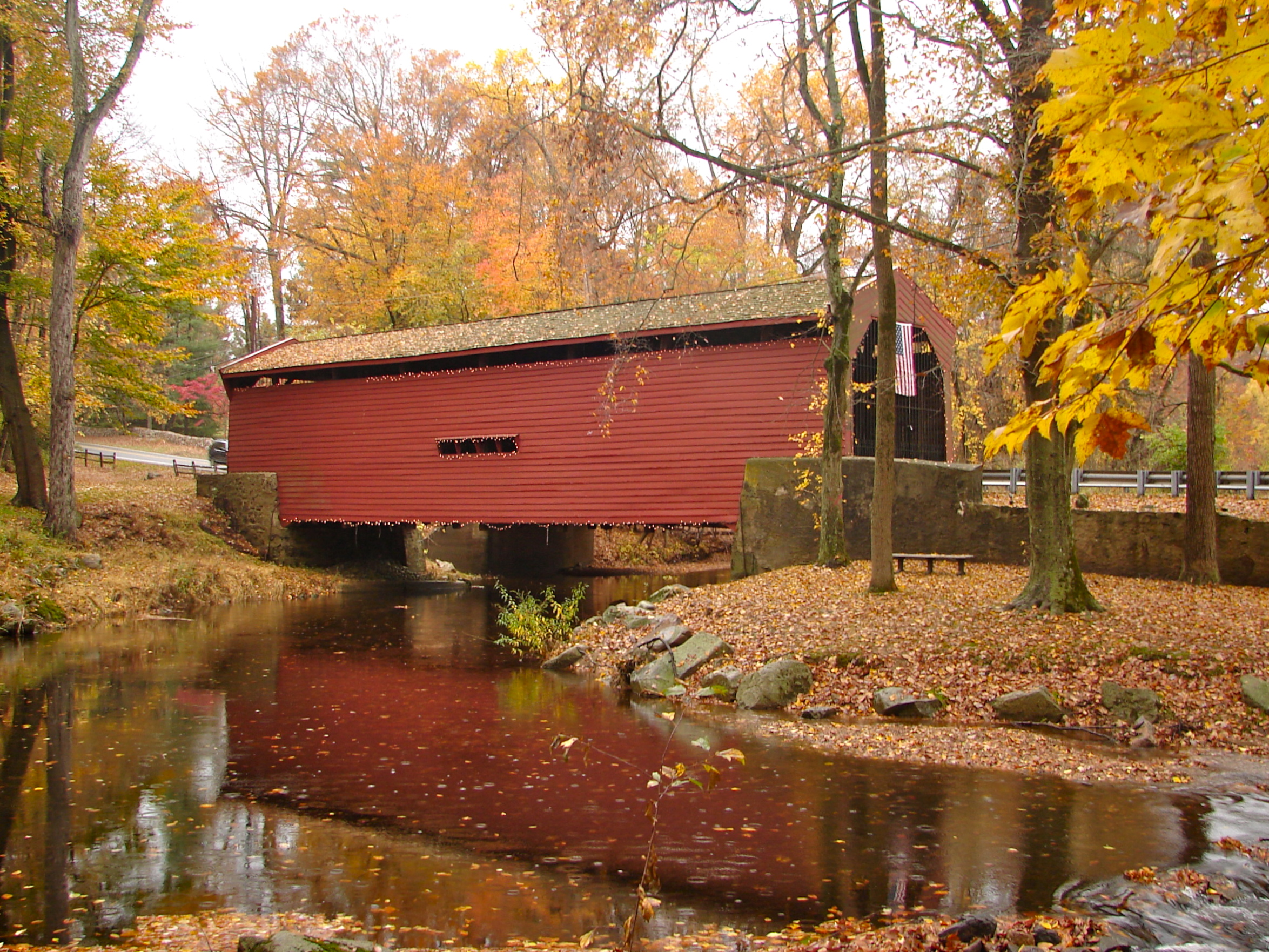
Bartram's Covered Bridge, built 1860 west of Newtown Square, crosses Crum Creek into Chester County

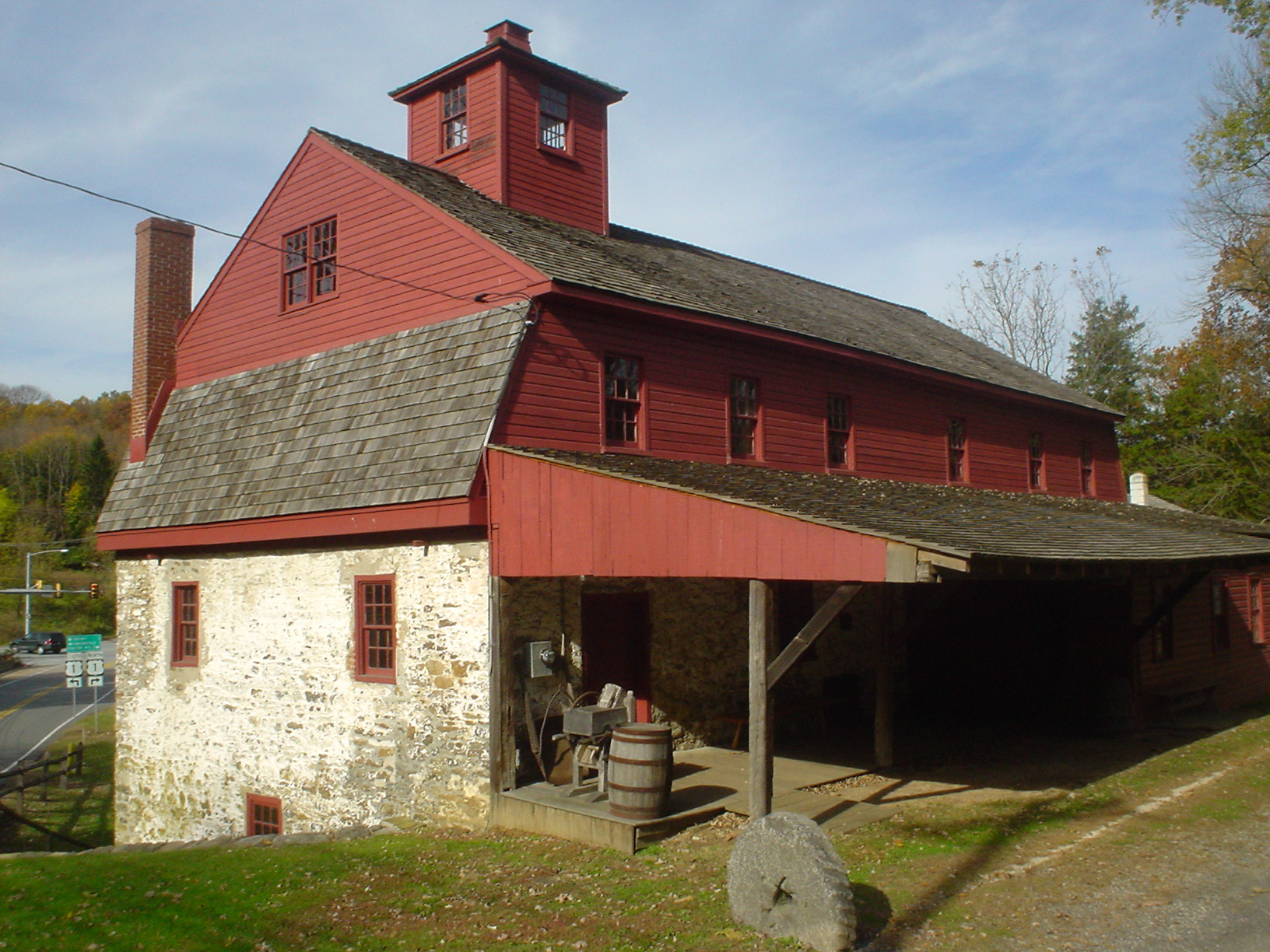
Newlin Mill, built 1704, on the west branch of Chester Creek, near Concordville

According to the U.S. Census Bureau, the county has a total area of 191 square miles (490 km^{2}), of which 184 square miles (480 km^{2}) is land and 6.8 square miles (18 km^{2}) (3.5%) is water. It is the third-smallest county in Pennsylvania by area.

Delaware County is roughly diamond- or kite-shaped, with the four sides formed by the Chester County boundary to the northwest, the boundary with the state of Delaware, a portion of the "Twelve-Mile Circle") to the southwest, the Delaware River, forming the border with the state of New Jersey) to the southeast, and the city of Philadelphia and Montgomery County to the east and northeast.

The lowest point in the state of Pennsylvania is located on the Delaware River in Marcus Hook in Delaware County, where it flows out of Pennsylvania and into Delaware. The highest point in Delaware County is 500 feet at two points southeast of Wyola in Newtown Township.

Waterways in Delaware County generally flow in a southward direction and ultimately drain into the Delaware River. The waterways are, from west to east: the Brandywine River (forming a portion of the county's western boundary with Chester County), Naaman's Creek, Stoney Creek, Chester Creek, Ridley Creek, Crum Creek, Muckinipates Creek, Darby Creek and Cobbs Creek (forming a portion of the county's eastern boundary with Philadelphia). Crum Creek was dammed in 1931 near Pennsylvania Route 252 to fill Springton Lake (also known as Geist Reservoir), an approximately 391-acre (1.58 km^{2}) drinking water reservoir maintained by Aqua America, the county's largest lake.

The Trainer Refinery and the Port of Chester are located along the shores of the Delaware River.

With its location in the southeastern part of the state, Delaware County is the only county to border both Delaware and New Jersey.

=== Adjacent counties ===
- Montgomery County (north)
- Philadelphia County (northeast)
- Gloucester County, New Jersey (southeast)
- New Castle County, Delaware (southwest)
- Chester County (west)

Delaware County is one of four counties in the United States to border a state with which it shares the same name (the other three are Nevada County, California, Texas County, Oklahoma, and Ohio County, West Virginia).

=== National protected areas ===
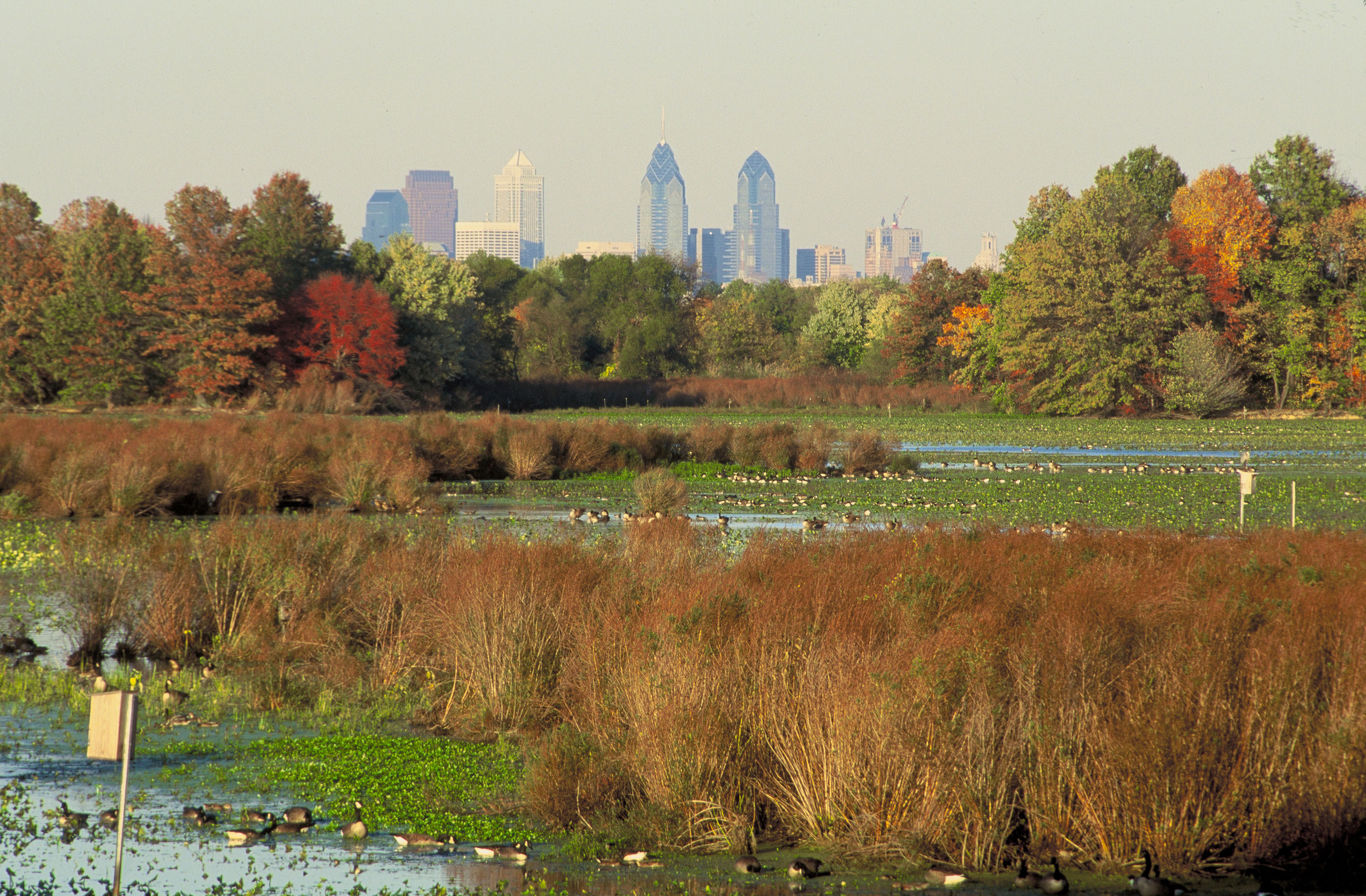
John Heinz National Wildlife Refuge

- First State National Historical Park (part)
- John Heinz National Wildlife Refuge (part)

=== State protected area ===
2,600 acres (11 km^{2}) of the county are occupied by the Ridley Creek State Park.

== Demographics ==
Historical population
Census	Pop.	Note	%±
1790	9,469		—
1800	12,809		35.3%
1810	14,734		15.0%
1820	14,810		0.5%
1830	17,323		17.0%
1840	19,791		14.2%
1850	24,679		24.7%
1860	30,597		24.0%
1870	39,403		28.8%
1880	56,101		42.4%
1890	74,683		33.1%
1900	94,762		26.9%
1910	117,906		24.4%
1920	173,084		46.8%
1930	280,264		61.9%
1940	310,756		10.9%
1950	414,234		33.3%
1960	553,154		33.5%
1970	600,035		8.5%
1980	555,007		−7.5%
1990	547,651		−1.3%
2000	550,864		0.6%
2010	558,979		1.5%
2020	576,830		3.2%
2025 (est.)	580,937	▲	0.7%
U.S. Decennial Census; 1790–1960 1900–1990; 1990–2000 2010–2019

=== 2020 census ===
As of the 2020 census, the county had a population of 576,830. The median age was 39.4 years. 22.0% of residents were under the age of 18 and 17.3% of residents were 65 years of age or older. For every 100 females there were 92.4 males, and for every 100 females age 18 and over there were 89.2 males age 18 and over.

The racial makeup of the county was 63.7% White, 22.4% Black or African American, 0.2% American Indian and Alaska Native, 6.3% Asian, <0.1% Native Hawaiian and Pacific Islander, 2.1% from some other race, and 5.2% from two or more races. Hispanic or Latino residents of any race comprised 4.6% of the population.

99.2% of residents lived in urban areas, while 0.8% lived in rural areas.

There were 215,498 households in the county, of which 31.6% had children under the age of 18 living in them. Of all households, 46.4% were married-couple households, 17.5% were households with a male householder and no spouse or partner present, and 30.3% were households with a female householder and no spouse or partner present. About 27.4% of all households were made up of individuals and 12.2% had someone living alone who was 65 years of age or older.

There were 229,208 housing units, of which 6.0% were vacant. Among occupied housing units, 67.8% were owner-occupied and 32.2% were renter-occupied. The homeowner vacancy rate was 1.2% and the rental vacancy rate was 7.1%.

=== Racial and ethnic composition ===
Delaware County, Pennsylvania – Racial and ethnic composition Note: the US Census treats Hispanic/Latino as an ethnic category. This table excludes Latinos from the racial categories and assigns them to a separate category. Hispanics/Latinos may be of any race.
Race / Ethnicity (NH = Non-Hispanic)	Pop 1980	Pop 1990	Pop 2000	Pop 2010	Pop 2020	% 1980	% 1990	% 2000	% 2010	% 2020
White alone (NH)	495,635	470,258	438,416	397,424	363,249	89.30%	85.87%	79.59%	71.10%	62.97%
Black or African American alone (NH)	49,544	60,688	79,070	108,231	127,055	8.93%	11.08%	14.35%	19.36%	22.03%
Native American or Alaska Native alone (NH)	379	566	529	674	676	0.07%	0.10%	0.10%	0.12%	0.12%
Asian alone (NH)	4,220	9,840	18,022	26,144	36,317	0.76%	1.80%	3.27%	4.68%	6.30%
Native Hawaiian or Pacific Islander alone (NH)	x	x	94	114	133	x	x	0.02%	0.02%	0.02%
Other race alone (NH)	1,023	301	551	725	2,596	0.18%	0.05%	0.10%	0.13%	0.45%
Mixed race or Multiracial (NH)	x	x	5,814	9,130	20,032	x	x	1.06%	1.63%	3.47%
Hispanic or Latino (any race)	4,206	5,998	8,368	16,537	26,772	0.76%	1.10%	1.52%	2.96%	4.64%
Total	555,007	547,651	550,864	558,979	576,830	100.00%	100.00%	100.00%	100.00%	100.00%

=== 2000 census ===
As of the 2000 census, there were 550,864 people, 206,320 households, and 139,472 families residing in the county. The population density was 2,990 inhabitants per square mile (1,150/km^{2}). There were 216,978 housing units at an average density of 1,178 per square mile (455/km^{2}). The racial makeup of the county was 80.3% White, 14.5% African American, 0.1% Native American, 3.3% Asian, <0.1% Pacific Islander, 0.6% from other races, and 1.2% from two or more races. 1.5% of the population were Hispanic or Latino of any race. 24.6% were of Irish, 17.5% Italian, 10.1% German and 6.7% English ancestry.

There were 206,320 households, out of which 31.5% had children under the age of 18 living with them, 50.8% were married couples living together, 12.9% had a female householder with no husband present, and 32.4% were non-families. 27.6% of all households were made up of individuals, and 11.6% had someone living alone who was 65 years of age or older. The average household size was 2.56 and the average family size was 3.17.

In the county, the population was spread out, with 24.8% under the age of 18, 8.9% from 18 to 24, 28.8% from 25 to 44, 21.9% from 45 to 64, and 15.6% who were 65 years of age or older. The median age was 37 years. For every 100 females there were 91.2 males. For every 100 females age 18 and over, there were 86.9 males.

The median income for a household in the county was $50,092, and the median income for a family was $61,590. Males had a median income of $44,155 versus $31,831 for females. The per capita income for the county was $25,040. About 5.8% of families and 8.0% of the population were below the poverty line, including 10.0% of those under age 18 and 7.1% of those age 65 or over.

== Communities ==
Map of Delaware County, Pennsylvania with municipal labels showing cities (yellow), boroughs (red), townships (white), and census-designated places (blue)

Under Pennsylvania law, there are four types of incorporated municipalities: cities, boroughs, townships, and exactly one town. There are 49 municipalities in Delaware County:

=== City ===
- Chester

=== Boroughs ===
- Aldan
- Brookhaven
- Chester Heights
- Clifton Heights
- Collingdale
- Colwyn
- Darby
- East Lansdowne
- Eddystone
- Folcroft
- Glenolden
- Lansdowne
- Marcus Hook
- Media (county seat)
- Millbourne
- Morton
- Norwood
- Parkside
- Prospect Park
- Ridley Park
- Rose Valley
- Rutledge
- Sharon Hill
- Swarthmore
- Trainer
- Upland
- Yeadon

=== Townships ===
- Aston
- Bethel
- Chadds Ford
- Chester
- Concord
- Darby
- Edgmont
- Haverford
- Lower Chichester
- Marple
- Middletown
- Nether Providence
- Newtown
- Radnor
- Ridley
- Springfield
- Thornbury
- Tinicum
- Upper Chichester
- Upper Darby
- Upper Providence

=== Census-designated places ===
Census-designated places are geographical areas designated by the U.S. Census Bureau for the purposes of compiling demographic data. They are not actual jurisdictions under Pennsylvania law. Other unincorporated communities, such as villages, may be listed here as well.

- Ardmore (partially in Montgomery County)
- Boothwyn
- Broomall
- Bryn Mawr (mostly in Montgomery County)
- Chadds Ford (mostly in Chester County)
- Cheyney University (mostly in Chester County)
- Dilworthtown (mostly in Chester County)
- Drexel Hill
- Folsom
- Haverford College (partially in Montgomery County)
- Lima
- Linwood
- Rosemont (mostly in Montgomery County)
- St. Davids
- Village Green-Green Ridge
- Villanova (partially in Montgomery County)
- Wayne
- Woodlyn

=== Unincorporated communities ===
- Brookline
- Garrett Hill
- Glen Mills
- Havertown
- Llanerch
- Oakmont
- Radnor
- Riddlewood
- Secane
- Thornton
- Wallingford
- Wawa

=== Population ranking ===
The population ranking of the following table is based on the 2020 census of Delaware County.

† county seat

Rank	City/Town/etc.	Municipal type	Population (2020 Census)	Total Area	Population Density	Incorporation	Settlement
1	Upper Darby	Township	85,681	7.83 sq mi	10,942.7/sq mi	1736	1682
2	Haverford	Township	50,431	9.95 sq mi	5,068.4/sq mi	1682	1682
3	Radnor	Township	33,228	13.79 sq mi	2,409.6/sq mi	1684	1682
4	Chester	City	32,605	6.00 sq mi	5,434.2/sq mi	1701 (borough) 1866 (city)	1644
5	Ridley	Township	31,053	5.31 sq mi	5,848.0/sq mi	1687	1647
6	Drexel Hill	CDP	29,181	3.20 sq mi	9,119.1/sq mi		
7	Springfield	Township	25,070	6.34 sq mi	3,954.3/sq mi	1686	1682
8	Marple	Township	24,214	10.52 sq mi	2,301.7/sq mi	1684	1684
9	Concord	Township	18,295	13.64 sq mi	1,341.3/sq mi	1683	1660
10	Upper Chichester	Township	16,898	6.70 sq mi	2,531.6/sq mi	1759	1681
11	Aston	Township	16,791	5.84 sq mi	2,880.3/sq mi	1688	1681
12	Middletown	Township	16,373	13.47 sq mi	1,215.5/sq mi	1686	1681
13	Newtown	Township	15,002	10.09 sq mi	1,486.8/sq mi	1684	1681
14	Nether Providence	Township	14,525	4.72 sq mi	3,077.3/sq mi	1687	1687
15	Ardmore (partially in Montgomery County)	CDP	13,566	1.97 sq mi	6,886.3/sq mi		
16	Yeadon	Borough	12,054	1.59 sq mi	7,581.1/sq mi	1893	1682
17	Broomall	CDP	11,718	3.17 sq mi	3,696.5/sq mi		
18	Lansdowne	Borough	11,107	1.18 sq mi	9,412.7/sq mi	1893	1732
19	Upper Providence	Township	10,852	5.81 sq mi	1,867.8/sq mi	1687	
20	Darby	Borough	10,715	0.84 sq mi	12,756.0/sq mi	1853	1682
21	Woodlyn	CDP	9,685	1.7 sq mi	5,697.1/sq mi		
22	Bethel	Township	9,574	5.41 sq mi	1,769.7/sq mi	1683	1682
23	Darby	Township	9,219	1.42 sq mi	6,492.3/sq mi	1683	1682
24	Collingdale	Borough	8,908	0.87 sq mi	10,239.1/sq mi	1891	
25	Brookhaven	Borough	8,300	1.71 sq mi	4,882.4/sq mi	1945	1684
26	Folsom	CDP	8,287	1.25 sq mi	6,629.6/sq mi		
27	Villanova (partially in Montgomery County)	CDP	8,213	2.09 sq mi	3,929.7/sq mi		
28	Village Green-Green Ridge	CDP	8,000	1.9 sq mi	4,210.5/sq mi		
29	Glenolden	Borough	7,223	0.97 sq mi	7,446.4/sq mi	1894	
30	Ridley Park	Borough	7,186	1.08 sq mi	6,653.7/sq mi	1897	
31	Wayne	CDP	7,160	2.12 sq mi	3,377.4/sq mi		
32	Thornbury	Township	6,904	9.27 sq mi	744.8/sq mi	1687	
33	Clifton Heights	Borough	6,863	0.63 sq mi	10,893.7/sq mi	1885	
34	Folcroft	Borough	6,792	1.42 sq mi	4,783.1/sq mi	1922	
35	Swarthmore	Borough	6,543	1.40 sq mi	4,673.6/sq mi	1893	1724
36	Prospect Park	Borough	6,427	0.74 sq mi	8,685.1/sq mi	1894	1694
37	Sharon Hill	Borough	6,014	0.77 sq mi	7,810.4/sq mi	1890	
38	Norwood	Borough	5,943	0.82 sq mi	7,247.6/sq mi	1893	
39	† Media	Borough	5,901	0.77 sq mi	7,663.6/sq mi	1850	1681
40	Bryn Mawr (mostly in Montgomery County)	CDP	5,879	0.96 sq mi	6,124.0/sq mi		
41	Boothwyn	CDP	4,968	1.25 sq mi	3,974.4/sq mi		
42	Edgmont	Township	4,283	9.73 sq mi	440.2/sq mi	1687	1687
43	Aldan	Borough	4,244	0.60 sq mi	7,073.3/sq mi	1893	
44	Chester	Township	4,080	1.43 sq mi	2,853.1/sq mi	1683	
45	Tinicum	Township	3,983	8.78 sq mi	453.6/sq mi	1780	1643
46	Chadds Ford	Township	3,972	8.72 sq mi	455.5/sq mi	1684	
47	Linwood	CDP	3,949	0.65 sq mi	6,075.4/sq mi		
48	St. Davids	CDP	3,604	1.5 sq mi	2,402.7/sq mi		
49	Rosemont (mostly in Montgomery County)	CDP	3,507	0.82 sq mi	4,276.8/sq mi		
50	Lower Chichester	Township	3,425	1.07 sq mi	3,200.9/sq mi	1682	1678
51	Upland	Borough	3,068	0.65 sq mi	4,720.0/sq mi	1869	1683
52	Chester Heights	Borough	2,897	2.22 sq mi	1,305.0/sq mi	1945	
53	Morton	Borough	2,778	0.36 sq mi	7,716.7/sq mi	1898	
54	Lima	CDP	2,745	1.47 sq mi	1,867.3/sq mi		
55	East Lansdowne	Borough	2,714	0.21 sq mi	12,923.8/sq mi	1911	
56	Colwyn	Borough	2,474	0.26 sq mi	9,515.4/sq mi	1892	
57	Eddystone	Borough	2,459	1.52 sq mi	1,617.8/sq mi	1888	1641
58	Marcus Hook	Borough	2,454	1.62 sq mi	1,514.8/sq mi	1892	
59	Parkside	Borough	2,321	0.21 sq mi	11,052.4/sq mi	1945	
60	Trainer	Borough	1,976	1.38 sq mi	1,431.9/sq mi	1919	
61	Haverford College (partially in Montgomery County)	CDP	1,497	0.31 sq mi	4,829.0/sq mi		
62	Chadds Ford (mostly in Chester County)	CDP	1,476	2.28 sq mi	647.4/sq mi		
63	Millbourne	Borough	1,212	0.07 sq mi	16,378.4/sq mi	1909	1682
64	Rose Valley	Borough	1,017	0.73 sq mi	1,393.2/sq mi	1923	1682
65	Dilworthtown (mostly in Chester County)	CDP	1,150	0.64 sq mi	1,796.9/sq mi		
66	Rutledge	Borough	782	0.14 sq mi	5,585.7/sq mi	1887	1885
67	Cheyney University (mostly in Chester County)	CDP	565	0.30 sq mi	1,883.3/sq mi		

== Politics and government ==
Results of the 2024 United States presidential election in Delaware County Harris: 90–100%; 80–90%; 70–80%; 60–70%; 50–60%; 40–50%; Trump: 60–70%; 50–60%; 40–50%; Other: Tie No data

Results in Delaware County of the 1971 Pennsylvania referendum to prohibit sex discrimination Yes: 80–90%; 70–80%; 60–70%; 50–60%; No: 50–60%

Results in Delaware County of the 2021 Pennsylvania referendum to prohibit racial and ethnic discrimination Yes: 90–100%; 80–90%; 70–80%; 60–70%; 50–60%

United States presidential election results for Delaware County, Pennsylvania
Year	Republican		Democratic		Third party(ies)	
Year	No.	%	No.	%	No.	%
1880	7,008	60.84%	4,473	38.83%	38	0.33%
1884	7,512	61.27%	4,538	37.01%	211	1.72%
1888	8,791	62.04%	5,028	35.48%	351	2.48%
1892	9,272	60.72%	5,520	36.15%	477	3.12%
1896	13,979	75.27%	4,169	22.45%	424	2.28%
1900	13,794	74.96%	4,249	23.09%	358	1.95%
1904	15,032	78.15%	3,586	18.64%	618	3.21%
1908	15,184	70.75%	5,727	26.69%	550	2.56%
1912	8,418	36.23%	6,001	25.82%	8,819	37.95%
1916	16,315	65.96%	7,742	31.30%	677	2.74%
1920	34,126	75.34%	9,602	21.20%	1,565	3.46%
1924	41,998	81.80%	6,368	12.40%	2,979	5.80%
1928	83,092	73.57%	29,378	26.01%	471	0.42%
1932	75,291	68.19%	32,413	29.36%	2,705	2.45%
1936	74,899	52.37%	65,117	45.53%	2,997	2.10%
1940	80,158	56.88%	60,225	42.73%	549	0.39%
1944	78,533	54.80%	64,021	44.67%	755	0.53%
1948	93,412	60.93%	57,156	37.28%	2,747	1.79%
1952	129,743	61.56%	80,316	38.11%	689	0.33%
1956	143,663	63.51%	82,024	36.26%	523	0.23%
1960	135,672	52.02%	124,629	47.79%	482	0.18%
1964	111,189	42.91%	147,189	56.81%	717	0.28%
1968	133,777	50.21%	106,695	40.05%	25,964	9.74%
1972	175,414	63.91%	94,144	34.30%	4,893	1.78%
1976	148,679	54.88%	117,252	43.28%	4,963	1.83%
1980	143,282	55.78%	88,314	34.38%	25,263	9.84%
1984	161,754	61.79%	98,207	37.51%	1,821	0.70%
1988	147,656	59.95%	96,144	39.03%	2,505	1.02%
1992	108,587	40.81%	111,210	41.80%	46,277	17.39%
1996	92,628	39.46%	115,946	49.39%	26,174	11.15%
2000	105,836	42.66%	134,861	54.36%	7,380	2.97%
2004	120,425	42.32%	162,601	57.15%	1,512	0.53%
2008	115,273	38.75%	178,870	60.12%	3,367	1.13%
2012	110,853	38.82%	171,792	60.16%	2,919	1.02%
2016	110,667	36.97%	177,402	59.27%	11,267	3.76%
2020	118,639	36.02%	206,709	62.75%	4,056	1.23%
2024	123,421	37.49%	201,324	61.15%	4,470	1.36%

United States Senate election results for Delaware County, Pennsylvania1
Year	Republican		Democratic		Third party(ies)	
Year	No.	%	No.	%	No.	%
1994	94,285	52.70%	78,509	43.88%	6,111	3.42%
2000	128,768	54.15%	105,712	44.46%	3,306	1.39%
2006	79,534	38.31%	128,052	61.69%	0	0.00%
2012	98,659	37.19%	164,024	61.83%	2,579	0.97%
2018	84,423	33.63%	163,216	65.03%	3,363	1.34%
2024	121,482	37.21%	197,424	60.47%	7,551	2.31%

The county has operated under a home-rule charter with five at-large council-members since 1972.

United States Senate election results for Delaware County, Pennsylvania3
Year	Republican		Democratic		Third party(ies)	
Year	No.	%	No.	%	No.	%
1992	136,228	53.17%	111,242	43.42%	8,759	3.42%
1998	101,502	66.93%	44,704	29.48%	5,444	3.59%
2004	144,316	52.44%	125,407	45.57%	5,480	1.99%
2010	84,630	43.86%	108,307	56.14%	0	0.00%
2016	126,300	43.01%	163,377	55.64%	3,948	1.34%
2022	87,322	34.84%	157,599	62.87%	5,746	2.29%

Pennsylvania Gubernatorial election results for Delaware County
Year	Republican		Democratic		Third party(ies)	
Year	No.	%	No.	%	No.	%
1970	111,079	52.30%	95,419	44.93%	5,874	2.77%
1974	104,860	49.89%	103,276	49.14%	2,049	0.97%
1978	125,744	60.32%	80,468	38.60%	2,233	1.07%
1982	127,584	64.53%	67,874	34.33%	2,246	1.14%
1986	113,628	59.67%	75,218	39.50%	1,596	0.84%
1990	76,531	45.18%	92,865	54.82%	0	0.00%
1994	91,589	49.56%	64,065	34.67%	29,156	15.78%
1998	97,746	63.32%	42,283	27.39%	14,344	9.29%
2002	62,649	33.14%	123,117	65.12%	3,304	1.75%
2006	54,043	25.95%	154,249	74.05%	0	0.00%
2010	95,448	47.22%	106,704	52.78%	0	0.00%
2014	71,180	39.09%	110,934	60.91%	0	0.00%
2018	80,576	32.15%	167,211	66.71%	2,856	1.14%
2022	76,880	30.65%	170,162	67.83%	3,813	1.52%

Until the 1990s, Delaware County was regarded as a classic suburban Republican county. The Delaware County Republican political machine was controlled by William McClure and his son John J. McClure from 1875 to 1965. Delaware County voted for the Republican candidate all but once from 1860 through 1988, with the exception being Lyndon Johnson's national landslide of 1964.

In 1992, however, the county swung from a 21-point win for George H. W. Bush to a narrow one-point win for Bill Clinton, who became only the second Democrat to win the county in the 20th century. Clinton won it just under 10 points in 1996, coming up just short of a majority. The county has gone Democratic in every Presidential election since then by 10 points or more by progressively-increasing margins. In the 2004 election Democratic presidential candidate John Kerry won the county by 14 points. Barack Obama won it by large 21-point margins in each of his bids for president. Hillary Clinton carried it by an equally substantial 22 points in 2016. Joe Biden carried it in 2020 with 62 percent of the vote, his second-strongest performance in Pennsylvania. Donald Trump turned in the worst showing for a Republican in the county in over 160 years.

Driving the county's Democratic shift have been longstanding trends in voter registration advantage and demographics. In 1998, Republicans held a voter registration advantage of about 125,000, but by 2008 that advantage had shrunk to under 20,000 voters. As of the November 2021 election, Democrats enjoyed a voter registration advantage of 50,000. Propelling and compounding the voter registration shift has been a change in demographics in the county. Since the 2000 Census, the White population of the county has decreased from 80.3% to 68.5% as of the 2020 Census, while, the Black population has risen from 14.5% to 22.7%, driven by the gentrification of Philadelphia and University City neighborhood and rapid demographic shift in Upper Darby. Further increasing the shift has been the change in education level demographics in the county, as voters have become more college educated and white collar (and, in turn, less blue collar) over the past few decades.

While the longstanding Republican registration edge has been erased, Republicans still remain competitive with Democrats at the state and local level. Most Republicans from the county tend to be fiscally conservative and socially moderate, as is the case with Republicans from most suburban Philadelphia counties. In the 2004 US Senate election, Republican Arlen Specter defeated Joe Hoeffel but Democrat Bob Casey, Jr. defeated Rick Santorum in the 2006 Senate election. All three Democratic state row office candidates carried it in 2008. In 2016, Delaware County elected all Democrats in national office elections except Republican Patrick Meehan (U.S. Representative).

After the election of Donald Trump in 2016, the county rapidly shifted blue as a result of increased Democratic turnout and less enthusiasm from often less conservative suburban Republicans. In the 2019 elections for the Delaware County Council, Democrats swept the board and elected Monica Taylor, Elaine P. Schaefer, and Christine Reuther, gaining control of the county Council for the first time since the Civil War. This was the first time in history that the county had an all-Democratic Council.

As of 2020, all of Delaware County is located in the state's 5th congressional district, represented by Democrat Mary Gay Scanlon. Prior to 2019, most of Delaware County had been in the 7th congressional district. The district had been held for 20 years by Republican Curt Weldon until he was ousted by Joe Sestak, a retired admiral, in the 2006 U.S. House of Representatives election. Also in the 2006 election, Democrat Bryan Lentz unseated Republican incumbent State Representative Tom Gannon in the 161st House district. In 2010 Sestak ran for the senate seat vacated by Arlen Specter and was replaced by Republican Pat Meehan, who defeated Lentz, the Democratic candidate. Lentz was replaced in the State House by Joe Hackett, a Republican. Meehan represented the 7th district until his resignation on April 27, 2018. Before it was thrown out by a Pennsylvania Supreme Court decision in 2018, the 7th Congressional District had been regarded one of the most irregularly drawn districts in the nation.

=== Voter registration ===
Chart of Voter Registration
1. Democratic (49.1%)
2. Republican (35.7%)
3. Independent (11.3%)
4. Other Parties (3.94%)

As of May 19, 2025, there are 407,783 registered voters in Delaware County.

- Democratic: 200,307 (49.12%)
- Republican: 145,462 (35.67%)
- Independent: 45,950 (11.27%)
- Third Party: 16,064 (3.94%)

=== Delaware County Council ===
As of January 5, 2026:

Office	Holder	Party
Chair	Richard Womack	Democratic
Vice-chair	Christine Reuther	Democratic
Member of Council	Monica Taylor	Democratic
Member of Council	Elaine Paul Schaefer	Democratic
Member of Council	Joanne Phillips, Esquire	Democratic

=== County row officers ===
Row officers, a term unique to Pennsylvania, are a conglomeration of elected officials defined by Article IX, Section 4 of the Pennsylvania Constitution. This unit of officers includes the position of controller, District Attorney, treasurer, sheriff, register of wills, recorder of deeds, prothonotaries, clerks of the court, and the coroner. It is thought that this term originated because these positions were arranged in a row on a typical ballot.

Office	Holder	Party
Controller	Louis F. Rosenthal	Democratic
District Attorney	Tanner Rouse	Democratic
Register of Wills	Vincent A. Rongione, Esquire	Democratic
Sheriff	Siddiq Kamara	Democratic

=== United States Senate ===
Senator	Party
John Fetterman	Democratic
Dave McCormick	Republican

=== United States House of Representatives ===
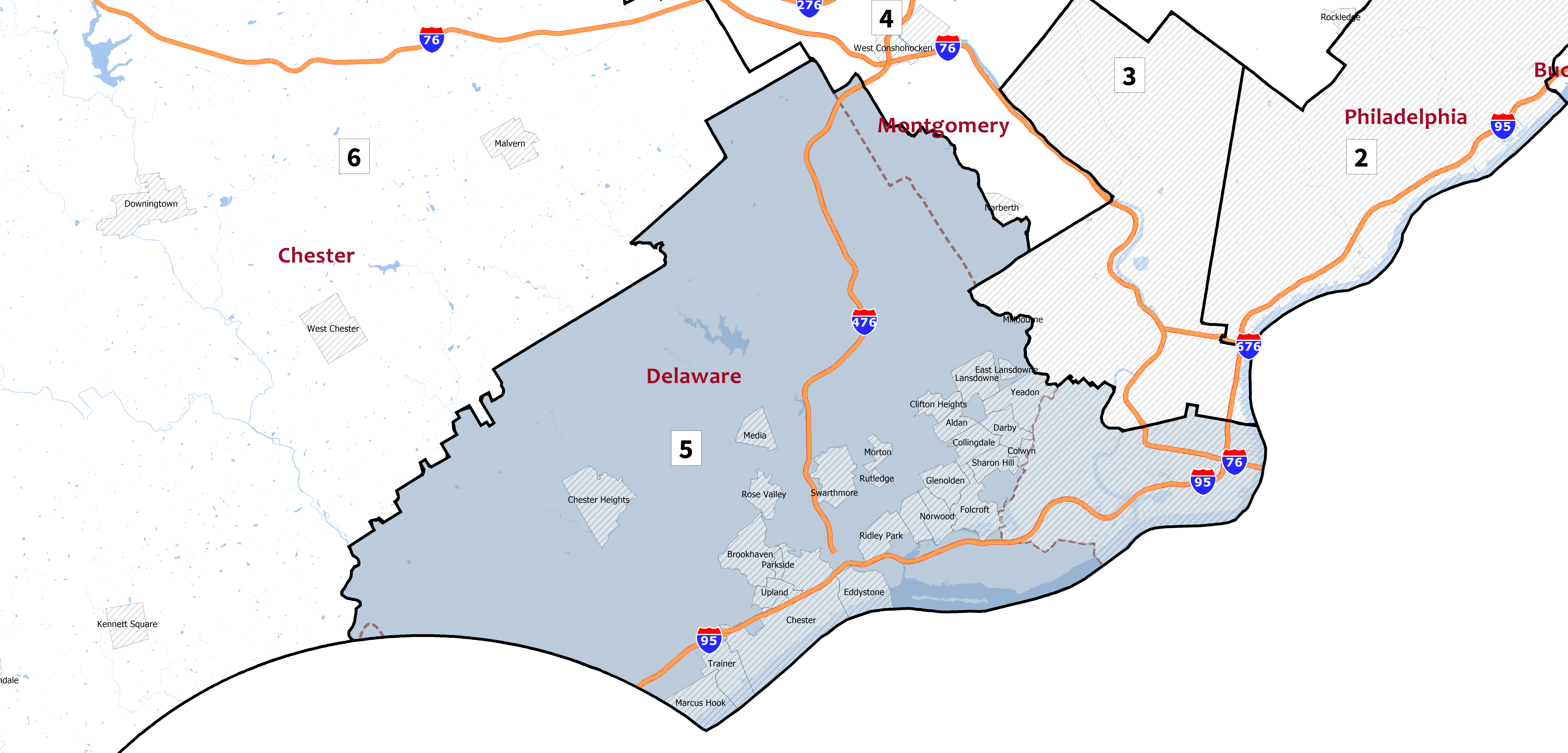
The 2018 congressional map ordered by the Supreme Court of Pennsylvania places all of Delaware County in the new 5th congressional district.

As of July 23, 2021:

District	Representative	Party
5	Mary Gay Scanlon	Democratic

=== State senate ===
As of July 23, 2021:

District	Representative	Party
8	Anthony Hardy Williams	Democratic
9	John I. Kane	Democratic
17	Amanda Cappelletti	Democratic
26	Tim Kearney	Democratic

=== State House of Representatives ===
As of March 2, 2022:

District	Representative	Party
159	Carol Kazeem	Democratic
160	Craig Williams	Republican
161	Leanne Krueger	Democratic
162	Dave Delloso	Democratic
163	Heather Boyd	Democratic
164	Gina Curry	Democratic
165	Jennifer O'Mara	Democratic
166	Greg Vitali	Democratic
168	Lisa Borowski	Democratic
185	Regina Young	Democratic
191	Joanna McClinton	Democratic

=== Corrections ===
The George W. Hill Correctional Facility (Delaware County Prison) is located in Thornbury Township. The jail houses pre-trial inmates and convicted persons who are serving sentences of no longer than two years less one day. It is operated by Delaware County.

== Education ==
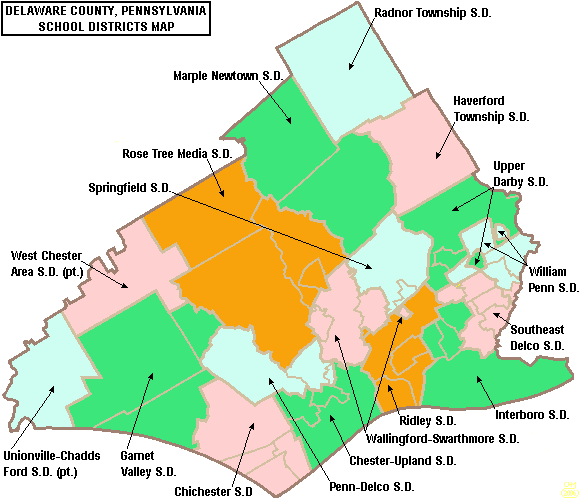
Map of Delaware County's school districts

=== Public school districts ===
School districts include:

- Chester Upland School District
- Chichester School District
- Garnet Valley School District
- Haverford Township School District
- Interboro School District
- Marple Newtown School District
- Penn-Delco School District
- Radnor Township School District
- Ridley School District
- Rose Tree Media School District
- Southeast Delco School District
- Springfield School District
- Upper Darby School District
- Wallingford-Swarthmore School District
- West Chester Area School District
- William Penn School District

Note that Delaware County Technical High School takes students from all of the county.

=== Charter schools ===
- Chester Community Charter School
- Widener Partnership Charter School
- Chester Charter Scholars Academy

=== Private schools ===
In 1963 the Roman Catholic Archdiocese of Philadelphia had 48 Catholic K-8/elementary schools in Delaware County with a total of 39,695 students, which was the highest ever enrollment. From 1971 to 2012, 20 of these schools closed, with ten of them closing from 2003 to 2012. By 2012 there were 28 Catholic K-8/elementary schools in Delaware County with a total of 8,291 students. One notable private school is Friends School Haverford.

=== Colleges and universities ===
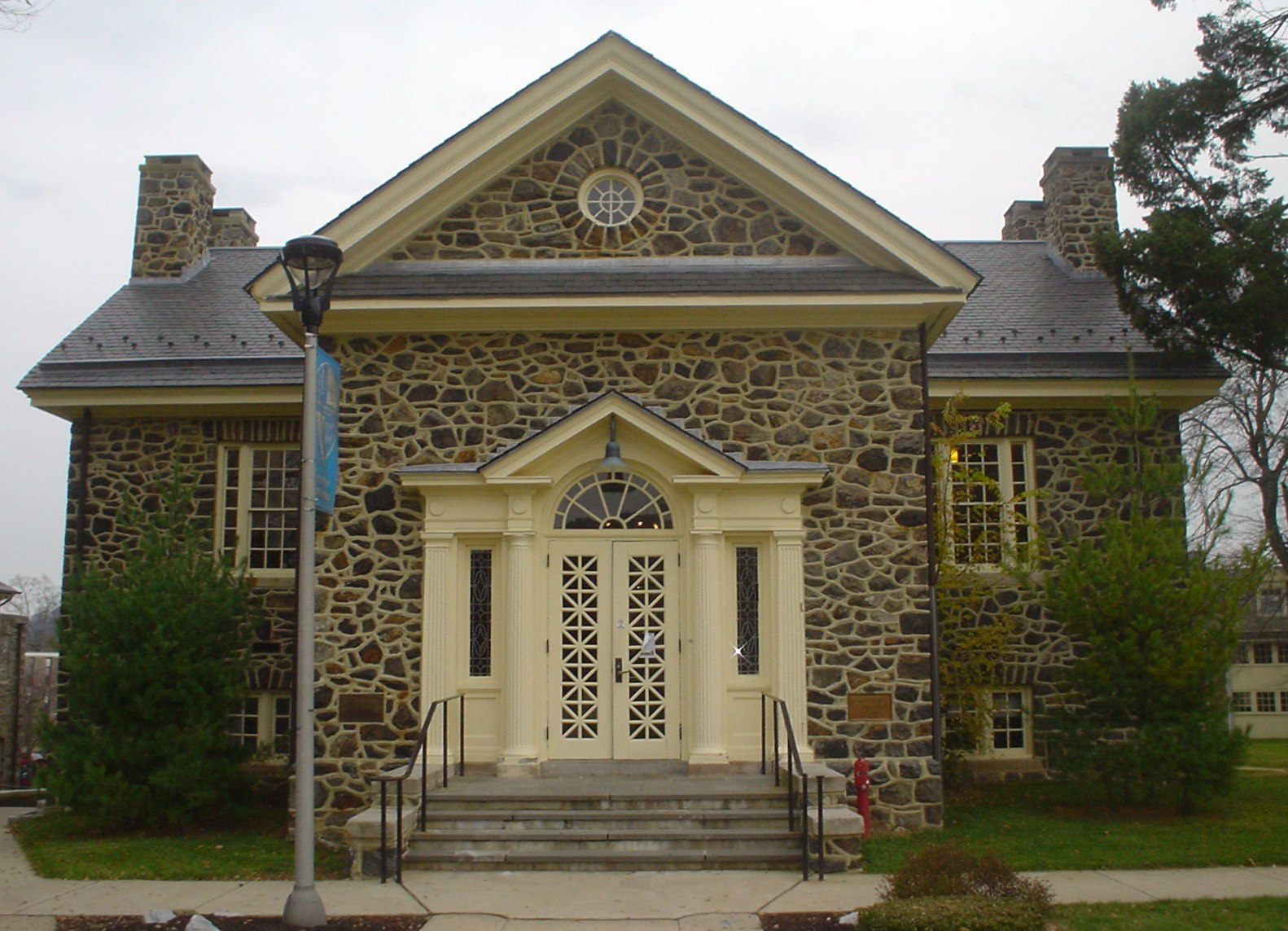
Library at Cheyney University

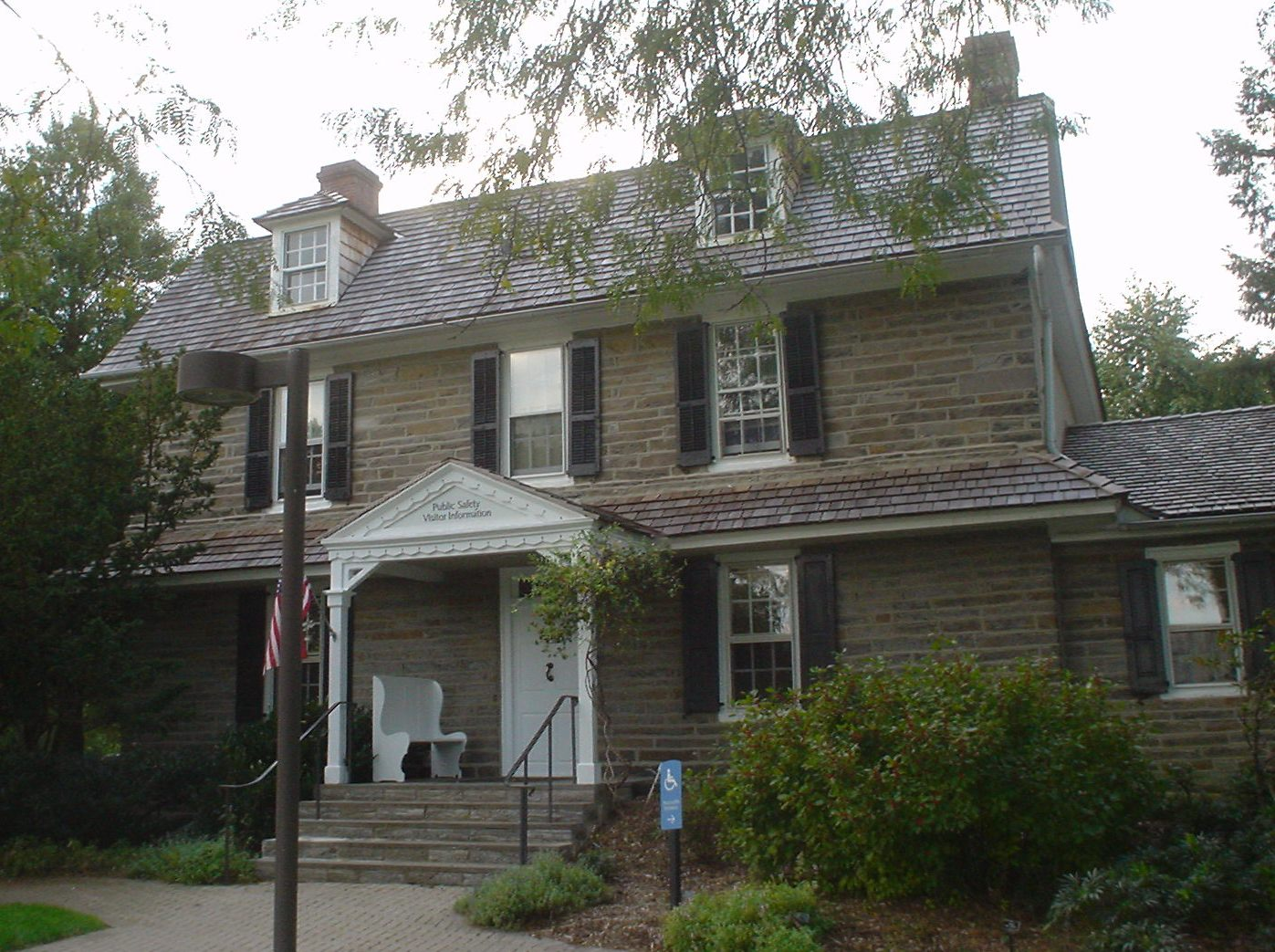
Benjamin West Birthplace on the campus of Swarthmore College

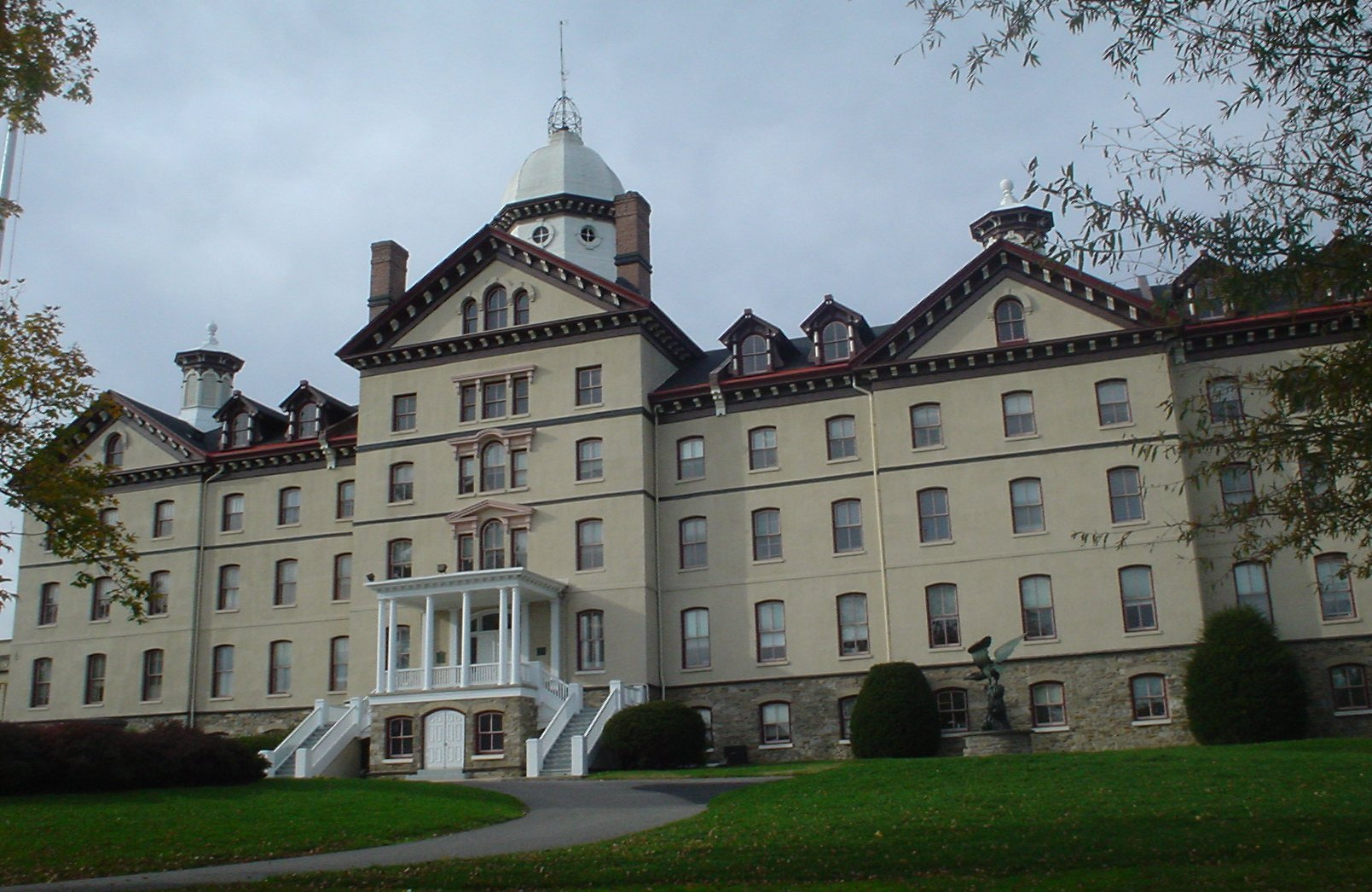
Old Main at Widener University

- Cabrini University
- Cheyney University
- Eastern University
- Delaware County Community College (locations in Marple Township, Upper Darby and Sharon Hill)
- Haverford College
- Neumann University
- Pendle Hill Quaker Center for Study and Contemplation
- Pennsylvania Institute of Technology
- Penn State Brandywine
- Rosemont College
- Swarthmore College
- Villanova University
- Widener University
- Williamson College of the Trades

=== Adult education ===
- Haverford Adult School
- Main Line School Night
- Senior Community Services Lifelong Learning
- Delaware County Literacy Council

== Transportation ==
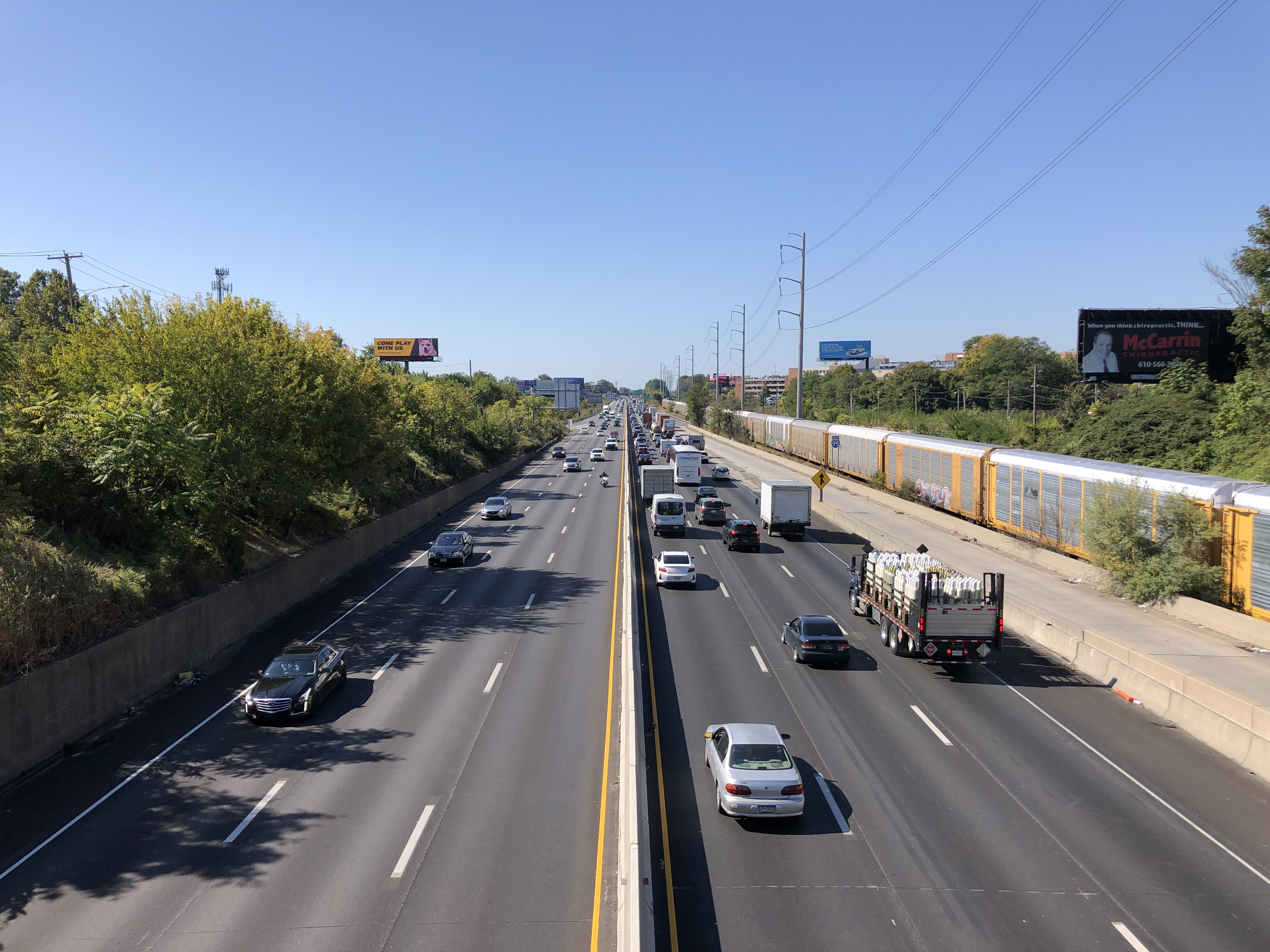
I-95 southbound in Delaware County

Delaware County is bisected north to south by Blue Route Interstate 476, which connects I-76 just north of the extreme northern corner of the county to I-95, which parallels the Delaware River along the southeastern edge of the county.

Delaware County is home to SEPTA's 69th Street Transportation Center in Upper Darby, and is served by the Norristown High Speed Line (P&W), two Red Arrow trolley lines, Media–Sharon Hill Line, four Regional Rail Lines, including the Airport Line, Wilmington/Newark Line, Media/Wawa Line, and Paoli/Thorndale Line), and a host of bus routes.

The western portion of Philadelphia International Airport is located in Delaware County, and the county hosts some airport-related commerce such as Philadelphia's UPS terminal and airport hotels.

=== Major roads and highways ===
- I-95
- I-476
- US 1
- US 13
- US 30
- US 202
- US 322
- PA 3
- PA 252
- PA 261
- PA 291
- PA 320
- PA 352
- PA 420
- PA 452
- PA 491
- PA 926

== Recreation ==
=== Parks ===
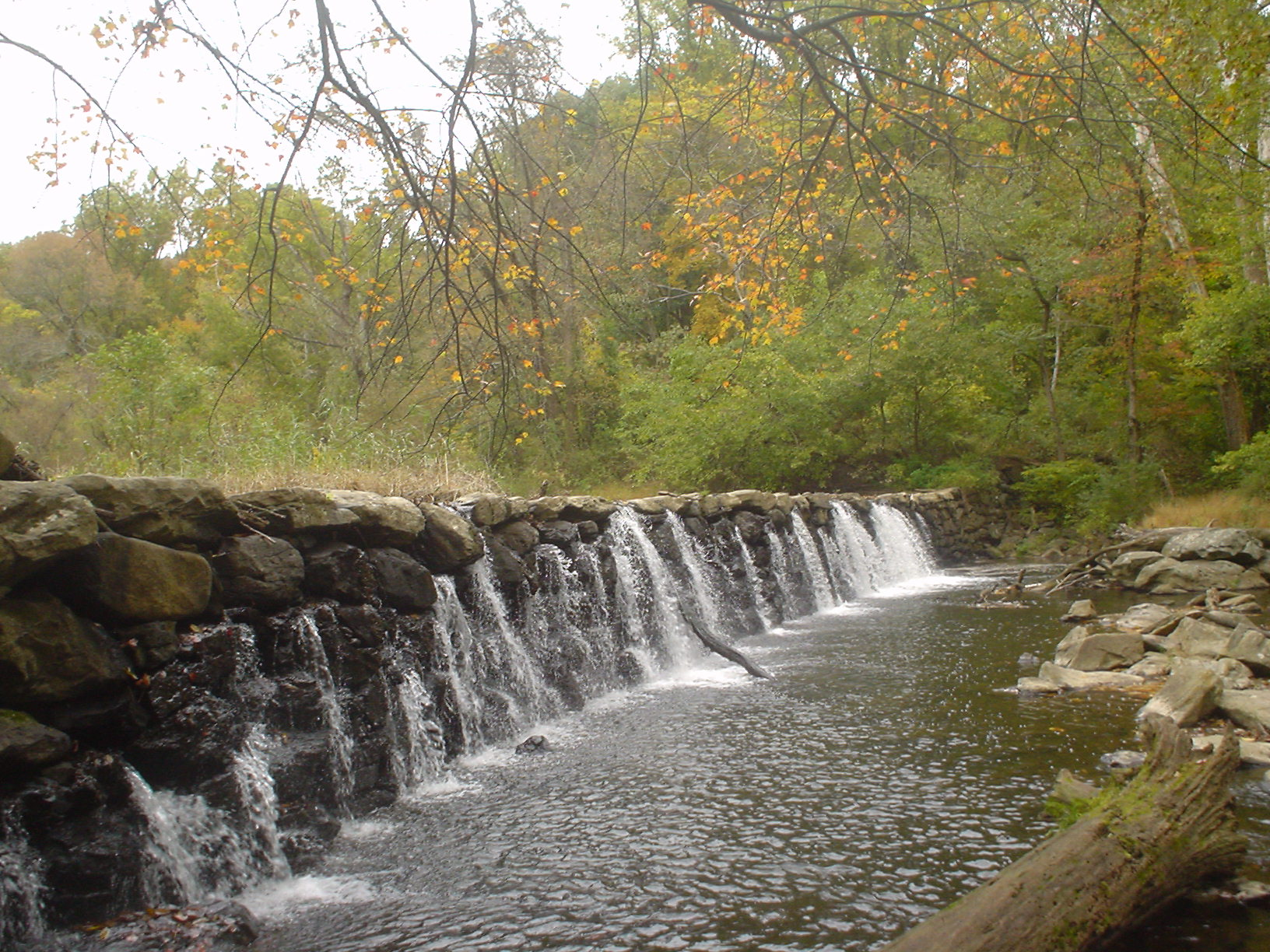
Dam on Ridley Creek in Ridley Creek State Park

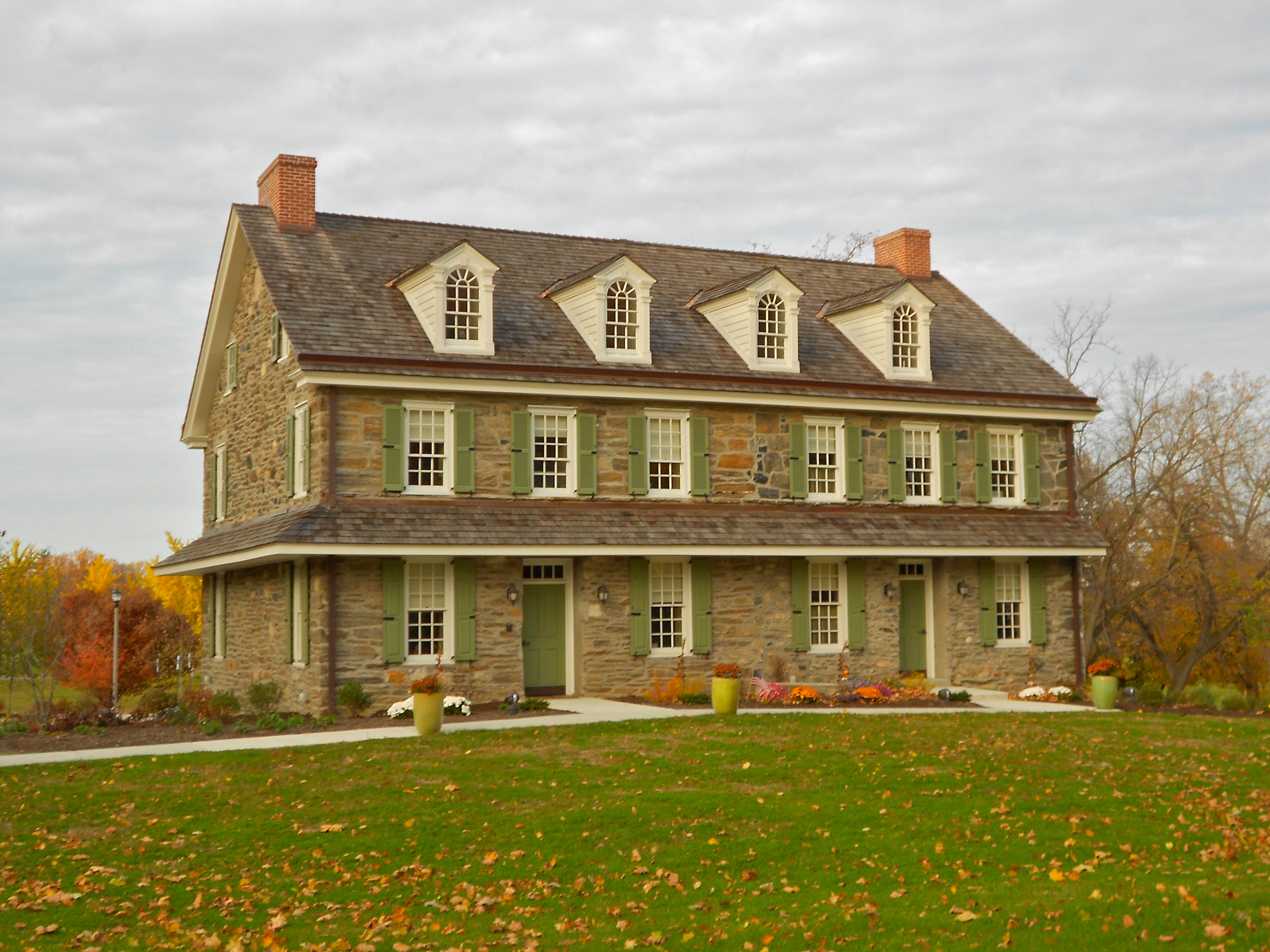
Old Rose Tree Tavern in Rose Tree Park

There is one Pennsylvania state park in Delaware County:

- Ridley Creek State Park

County parks include:

- Clayton Park & Golf Course
- Glen Providence Park
- Kent Park/Dog Park
- Rose Tree Park
- Smedley Park
- Upland Park

=== Racing ===
Harrah's Philadelphia is a harness racing track and casino (i.e., "racino") located on the Chester, Pennsylvania waterfront. It is owned by Vici Properties and operated by Caesars Entertainment.

== Sports ==
Chester is home to the Philadelphia Union of Major League Soccer; the team plays at Subaru Park, a venue located at the base of the Commodore Barry Bridge.

Delaware County is the traditional home of women's professional soccer in the Philadelphia area. The former Philadelphia Charge of the defunct Women's United Soccer Association played at Villanova Stadium, which is located on the campus of Villanova University. The Philadelphia Independence of Women's Professional Soccer succeeded the Charge and played at Widener University's Leslie Quick Stadium in 2011.

Delaware County is the home of one of oldest baseball leagues in the country, the Delco League, which is a semi-professional league that has been in existence since 1908.

Every summer, Delaware County is home to the Delco Pro-Am, a basketball league consisting of current, future, and former NBA players as well as local standout players.

Delaware County is also the former home of a rugby league team called the Aston Bulls, a member of the American National Rugby League.

Darby was home to the Hilldale Club, the 1925 Colored World Series champions.

== Media ==
The county is serviced by several newspapers, including Delaware County Daily Times, News of Delaware County, The Spirit, and The Suburban and Wayne Times.

The Philadelphia Inquirer also has a significant presence in Delaware County. Delaware County Magazine is the news magazine with the largest circulation in Delaware County, reaching over 186,000 homes.

== Animal services ==
Initially the Delaware County SPCA provided animal control in the county. In 2012 the organization stopped doing so, and it later changed its name to Providence Animal Center. The Animal Protection Board of Delaware County (APB) was established, and contracted with the Chester County SPCA, later the Brandywine Valley SPCA. After the APB was disestablished, there was no longer any single animal control entity in Delaware County. By 2016 multiple individual municipalities began contracting with the Brandywine Valley SPCA. In 2026 there were activists aiming to establish a countywide animal shelter for the county.

== Climate ==
Delaware County has two physical geographic regions: the Piedmont and the Atlantic Coastal Plain, Most of the county has a humid subtropical climate (Cfa) while some higher northern areas have a hot-summer humid continental climate (Dfa.). The hardiness zone is mostly 7b except for 7a in areas closer to Chester County (except along the Brandywine Creek) and 8a in Ridley Township near the Delaware River.

Climate data for Newtown Square (Elevation: 456 ft; 139 m) 1981–2010 Averages
Month	Jan	Feb	Mar	Apr	May	Jun	Jul	Aug	Sep	Oct	Nov	Dec	Year
Mean daily maximum °F (°C)	38.6 (3.7)	41.8 (5.4)	50.4 (10.2)	62.3 (16.8)	72.1 (22.3)	81.0 (27.2)	85.3 (29.6)	83.5 (28.6)	76.8 (24.9)	65.5 (18.6)	54.1 (12.3)	42.6 (5.9)	62.9 (17.2)
Daily mean °F (°C)	30.4 (−0.9)	33.1 (0.6)	40.6 (4.8)	51.6 (10.9)	61.2 (16.2)	70.5 (21.4)	75.2 (24.0)	73.7 (23.2)	66.3 (19.1)	55.0 (12.8)	44.8 (7.1)	34.6 (1.4)	53.2 (11.8)
Mean daily minimum °F (°C)	22.2 (−5.4)	24.3 (−4.3)	30.9 (−0.6)	40.8 (4.9)	50.2 (10.1)	60.0 (15.6)	65.1 (18.4)	63.8 (17.7)	55.7 (13.2)	44.4 (6.9)	35.5 (1.9)	26.6 (−3.0)	43.4 (6.3)
Average precipitation inches (mm)	3.36 (85)	2.80 (71)	3.89 (99)	3.84 (98)	4.08 (104)	3.94 (100)	4.71 (120)	3.88 (99)	4.65 (118)	3.87 (98)	3.61 (92)	3.89 (99)	46.52 (1,182)
Average relative humidity (%)	68.3	65.0	60.5	59.4	63.2	68.2	68.2	70.5	71.7	70.5	69.7	70.8	67.2
Average dew point °F (°C)	21.2 (−6.0)	22.6 (−5.2)	28.0 (−2.2)	37.9 (3.3)	48.6 (9.2)	59.5 (15.3)	64.0 (17.8)	63.5 (17.5)	56.9 (13.8)	45.6 (7.6)	35.5 (1.9)	26.1 (−3.3)	42.5 (5.8)
Source: PRISM

Climate data for Chester (Elevation: 10 ft; 3.0 m) 1981–2010 Averages
Month	Jan	Feb	Mar	Apr	May	Jun	Jul	Aug	Sep	Oct	Nov	Dec	Year
Mean daily maximum °F (°C)	40.5 (4.7)	44.2 (6.8)	52.0 (11.1)	63.4 (17.4)	73.4 (23.0)	82.7 (28.2)	87.0 (30.6)	85.2 (29.6)	78.3 (25.7)	66.7 (19.3)	56.1 (13.4)	45.0 (7.2)	64.6 (18.1)
Daily mean °F (°C)	33.7 (0.9)	36.5 (2.5)	43.7 (6.5)	54.3 (12.4)	64.1 (17.8)	73.7 (23.2)	78.3 (25.7)	76.8 (24.9)	69.5 (20.8)	58.1 (14.5)	48.3 (9.1)	38.2 (3.4)	56.4 (13.6)
Mean daily minimum °F (°C)	26.8 (−2.9)	28.9 (−1.7)	35.3 (1.8)	45.2 (7.3)	54.8 (12.7)	64.6 (18.1)	69.7 (20.9)	68.4 (20.2)	60.7 (15.9)	49.4 (9.7)	40.5 (4.7)	31.4 (−0.3)	48.1 (8.9)
Average precipitation inches (mm)	3.15 (80)	2.70 (69)	3.87 (98)	3.62 (92)	3.81 (97)	3.80 (97)	4.65 (118)	3.56 (90)	4.21 (107)	3.44 (87)	3.27 (83)	3.62 (92)	43.70 (1,110)
Average relative humidity (%)	65.3	60.7	57.6	57.2	60.8	62.7	64.4	65.8	67.8	67.3	65.3	65.1	63.4
Average dew point °F (°C)	23.3 (−4.8)	24.2 (−4.3)	29.7 (−1.3)	39.5 (4.2)	50.3 (10.2)	60.2 (15.7)	65.3 (18.5)	64.5 (18.1)	58.4 (14.7)	47.3 (8.5)	37.2 (2.9)	27.5 (−2.5)	44.0 (6.7)
Source: PRISM

== See also ==
- National Register of Historic Places listings in Delaware County, Pennsylvania
