= D. Barry Gibbons =

American politician

Member of the Pennsylvania House of Representatives from the Delaware County district
- In office 1961–1962
- Succeeded by: Edward Mifflin

Personal details
- Born: December 8, 1929
- Died: March 26, 1998 (aged 68)
- Resting place: Saint Francis de Sales Church Cemetery, Lenni, Pennsylvania, U.S.
- Party: Republican

D. Barry Gibbons (December 8, 1929 – March 26, 1998) was an American politician from Pennsylvania who served as a Republican member of the Pennsylvania House of Representatives for Delaware County from 1961 to 1962.

== Early life and education ==
Gibbons graduated from Upper Darby High School. He received an A.B. from Villanova University in 1951 and a LL.B. from Villanova University School of Law in 1956. He served in the United States Air Force during the Korean War from 1951 to 1953.

== Career ==
Gibbons was an attorney and partner in the law firm of Reed and Gibbons. He was elected to the Pennsylvania House of Representatives for Delaware County and served from 1961 to 1962.

== Personal life ==
Gibbons is interred at the St. Francis de Sales Church Cemetery in Lenni, Pennsylvania.
