= Edmund Jones =

American politician (1918–2019)

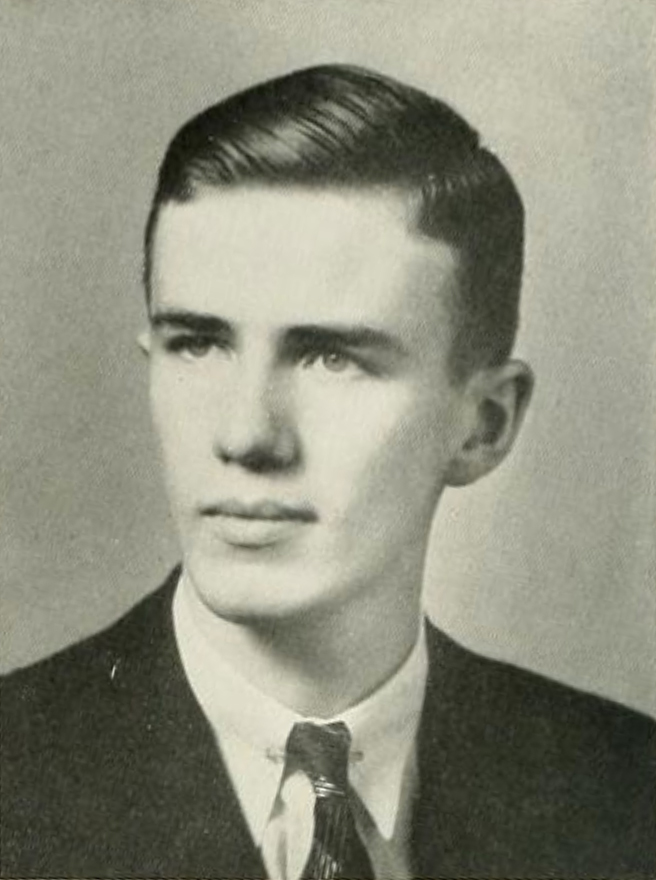
- Jones pictured at Swarthmore, c. 1939

Member of the Pennsylvania House of Representatives from the 161st district
- In office May 18, 1971 – November 30, 1974
- Preceded by: Edward Mifflin
- Succeeded by: Peter O'Keefe

Personal details
- Born: April 15, 1918 Chester, Pennsylvania, U.S.
- Died: September 14, 2019 (aged 101) Ridley Park, Pennsylvania, U.S.
- Party: Republican
- Education: Swarthmore College (BA); University of Pennsylvania (LLD)
- Occupation: lawyer

Edmund Jones (April 15, 1918 – September 14, 2019) was an American politician from Pennsylvania who served as a Republican member of the Pennsylvania House of Representatives, District 161 from 1971 to 1974.

== Early life and education ==
Jones was born in Chester, Pennsylvania on April 15, 1918. His family moved to Swarthmore, Pennsylvania in 1930.

He graduated from Swarthmore High School in 1935. He subsequently obtained a B.A. from Swarthmore College in 1939 and a LL.D. from University of Pennsylvania Law School in 1942.

He then served as a captain in the U.S. Army during World War II in a heavy automotive maintenance company. He was assigned to the war crimes branch in Wiesbaden, Germany.

After the war, Jones assisted with the Nuremberg War Trials, taking depositions from war crimes witnesses.

== Career ==
Jones practiced law in the Delaware County firm that his grandfather established in 1876.

From 1966 to 1971, Jones served as mayor of Swarthmore, Pennsylvania. Jones was elected to the Pennsylvania House of Representatives on May 18, 1971 to serve the remainder of the 1971 term after the death of Edward Mifflin in office. He was reelected in 1972 but lost reelection in 1974 to Peter O'Keefe.

In 1985, Jones was elected to the Swarthmore Borough Authority. He served from 1985 to 1989 and as the chair of the authority in 1989. Jones was elected to the Delaware County Council and served from 1987 to 1988. He served as the chair of the Delaware County Planning Commission from 1988 to 1989. He served as a board member of the Southeastern Pennsylvania Transportation Authority from 1989 to 1996.

== Personal life ==
In 1941, Jones was married to Adalyn and together they had three daughters and a son.

Jones was a member of the Rotarians for over 70 years, having joined the Chester Rotary Club in 1945.

Jones turned 100 in April 2018 and died in September 2019 in Ridley Park, Pennsylvania.

Pennsylvania House of Representatives
| Preceded by Edward Mifflin | Member of the Pennsylvania House of Representatives from the 161st district 1971–1974 | Succeeded by Peter O'Keefe |
