= Edward Mifflin =

American politician

Edward B. Mifflin

Member of the Pennsylvania House of Representatives from the 161st district
- In office January 7, 1969 – January 2, 1971
- Preceded by: District Created
- Succeeded by: Edmund Jones

Member of the Pennsylvania House of Representatives from the Delaware County district
- In office January 1, 1963 – November 30, 1968
- Preceded by: D. Barry Gibbons
- Succeeded by: District Closed

Personal details
- Born: September 26, 1923 Philadelphia, Pennsylvania, US
- Died: January 2, 1971 (aged 47)
- Party: Republican
- Education: Swarthmore College (BA)

Edward B. Mifflin (September 26, 1923 – January 2, 1971) was an American politician from Pennsylvania who served as a Republican member of the Pennsylvania House of Representatives for Delaware County from 1963 to 1968 and the Pennsylvania House of Representatives, District 161 from 1968 to 1971.

== Early life and education ==
Mifflin was born in Philadelphia, Pennsylvania. He attended Swarthmore High School in Swarthmore, Pennsylvania, and graduated from the Westtown School in West Chester, Pennsylvania, in 1941.

He served as a navigator in the United States Air Force during World War II from 1943 to 1945 and received the air force medal with an oak leaf cluster. He served as a 1st lieutenant with the United States Air Force Reserve from 1946 to 1951.

Mifflin obtained a B.A. from Swarthmore College in 1948.

== Business career ==
Mifflin worked for the Sporting News in St. Louis, Missouri, as a textile sales executive and as a director and vice president of a textile firm in Wilmington, Delaware.

Mifflin became a close friend of Ted Williams while working at the Sporting News and is credited with convincing Williams to stay in baseball longer in order to improve his baseball statistics before retirement.

== Political career ==
Mifflin was a member of the Delaware County Republican Committee from 1958 to 1962. He served as tax assessor for Delaware County from 1960 to 1963. He was elected to the Pennsylvania House of Representatives for Delaware County in 1962 and was reelected in 1964 and 1966. He became a member of the Appropriations Committee and served as chairman of the Labor Relations Committee. In 1968 Mifflin was elected to the newly created Pennsylvania House of Representatives, District 161 and was reelected in 1970. He died in office on January 2, 1971, and was succeeded by Edmund Jones.

== Personal life ==
Mifflin had three daughters and two sons.
