= Joe Hackett =

Joe Hackett may refer to:

- Joe Hackett (politician) (born 1959), former Member of the Pennsylvania House of Representatives
- Joe Hackett (tennis) (1925–2023), Irish tennis and rugby union player
