= Peter O'Keefe =

American politician

Peter J. O'Keefe

Member of the Pennsylvania House of Representatives from the 161st district
- In office January 7, 1975 – November 30, 1978
- Preceded by: Edmund Jones
- Succeeded by: Tom Gannon

Personal details
- Born: April 25, 1937 (age 89) Darby, Pennsylvania
- Party: Democratic
- Education: Villanova University (BS); Drexel University (MBA)

Peter J. O'Keefe (born April 25, 1937) is an American politician from Pennsylvania who served as a Democratic member of the Pennsylvania House of Representatives, District 161 from 1975 to 1978.

== Early life and education ==
O'Keefe was born in Darby, Pennsylvania and graduated from West Catholic Preparatory High School. He graduated from Villanova University with a B.S. in economics and from Drexel University with a M.B.A.

== Career ==
O'Keefe was a member of the Ridley Township Democratic Committee. He served as finance chair to the Delaware County Democratic Committee and as a member of the Delaware County Democratic Council. He was elected as a commissioner in Ridley Township and served from 1969 to 1975. He was elected to the Pennsylvania House of Representatives, District 161 in 1974 and reelected in 1976. He had an unsuccessful campaign for reelection in 1978 and lost to Tom Gannon.

Pennsylvania House of Representatives
Preceded by Edmund Jones	Member of the Pennsylvania House of Representatives from the 161st district 1975–1978	Succeeded by Tom Gannon
