= Mark Matkevich =

American actor

- Born: Philadelphia, Pennsylvania, U.S.
- Occupation: Actor
- Years active: 1999–present

Mark Matkevich is an American actor best known for appearing as Drue Valentine in 17 episodes of the television program Dawson's Creek and as a journalism student on the television series Deadline.

Matkevich graduated from Cardinal O'Hara High School in Springfield, Pennsylvania and attended Temple University in Philadelphia.
