= Brandywine Valley SPCA =

American nonprofit organization

Brandywine Valley SPCA (BVSPCA) is a nonprofit organization headquartered in Dover, Delaware.

The organization operates facilities in Delaware, Pennsylvania, and Washington, DC. It also contracts with third party organizations in Delaware, New Jersey, and Ohio.

The organization takes animals picked up by Delaware Animal Services, an agency of the Delaware state government. Additionally it contracts with Washington, DC to provide animal shelter and animal control services.

== History ==
It was established in 1929. Originally it was known as the Chester County SPCA (CCSPCA) and based in Pennsylvania. It has provided animal services for Chester and Delaware counties. Its original facility is in West Goshen Township, and has a West Chester mailing address.

The organization received its current name in 2016. That year, it began providing animal services for all of the State of Delaware. In 2017 an animal shelter in Georgetown, Delaware was moved into the management of the Brandywine Valley SPCA from the Delaware SPCA. The Delaware SPCA then merged with the Delaware Humane Association, to form the organization Humane Animal Partners.

After the Delaware County SPCA (now Providence Animal Center) stopped doing animal control, The Animal Protection Board of Delaware County (APB) was established, and contracted with the Chester County SPCA. After the APB was disestablished, there was no longer any single animal control entity in Delaware County. By 2016 multiple individual municipalities began contracting with the Brandywine Valley SPCA.

In 2022 the agency opened a new shelter facility in Delaware with an intensive care unit for animals in the agency's care. The facility's name is the Copeland Center for Animal Welfare, and it is in unincorporated New Castle County. This was in place of a previous shelter in the City of New Castle or "Old New Castle".

Previously the Humane Rescue Alliance operated animal shelters, animal control, animal law enforcement, and animal medical services for Washington, DC. On January 1, 2025, the district continued the latter two functions with the Human Rescue Alliance but gave the former two services to the Brandywine Valley SPCA on that date. The D.C. Village Lane facility opened in November 2025, replacing the former New York Avenue shelter.

== Facilities ==
Delaware

- Copeland Center for Animal Welfare - unincorporated New Castle County (New Castle postal address)
- Dover - Dover
- Georgetown and Animal Rescue Center Georgetown - unincorporated Sussex County (Georgetown address)

District of Columbia

- DC Village
- Ivy City Adoption Center

Pennsylvania

- West Chester - West Goshen Township (West Chester mailing address)
