= Haverford College, Pennsylvania =

Unincorporated community in Pennsylvania, US

Haverford College (CDP), Pennsylvania
- Census-designated place
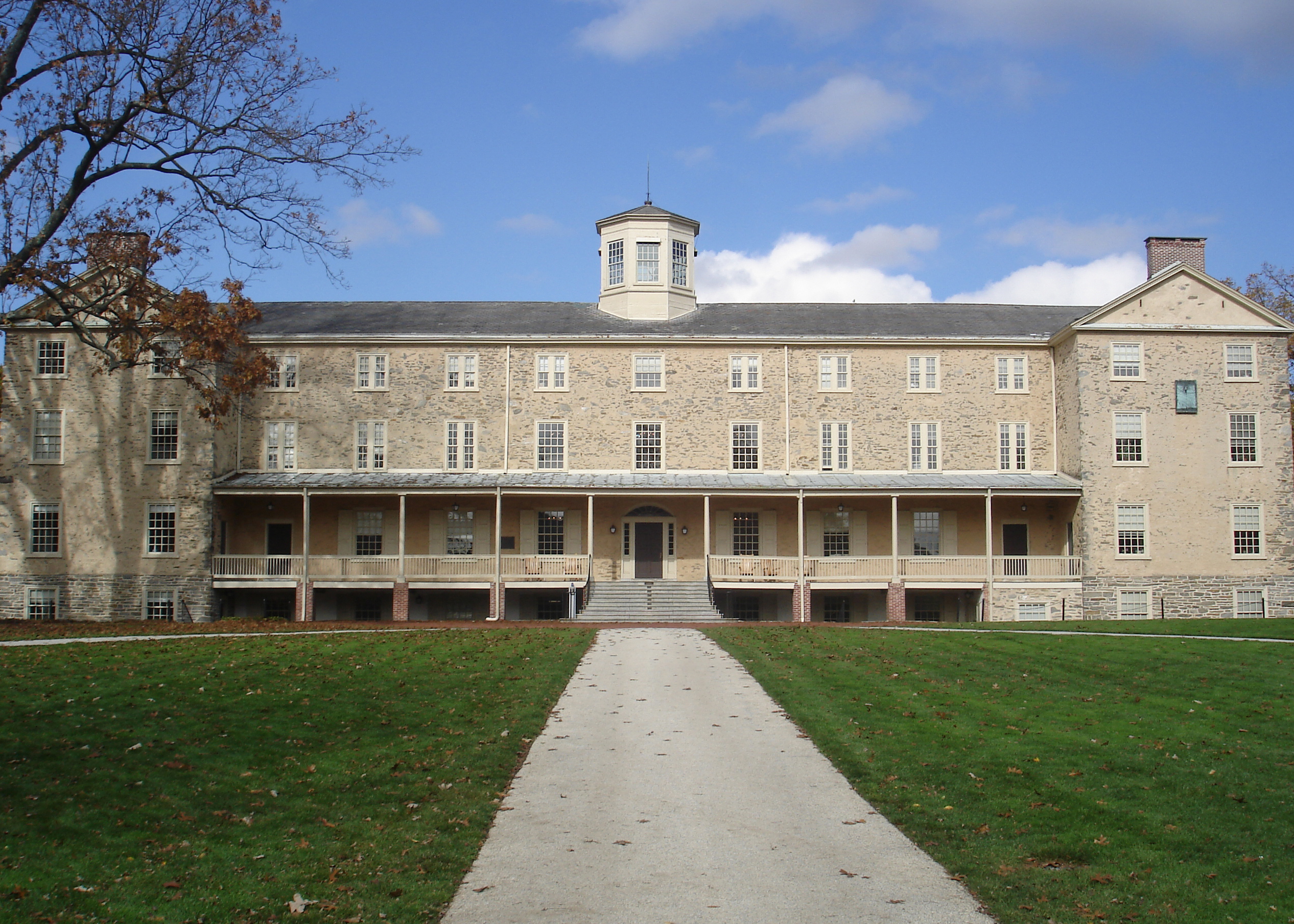
- Founders Hall

- Location in Delaware County and the state of Pennsylvania
- Coordinates: 40°00′29″N 75°18′23″W
- Country: United States
- State: Pennsylvania
- Counties: Delaware, Montgomery
- Townships: Haverford, Lower Merion

Area
  - Total: 0.31 sq mi (0.80 km^{2})
  - Land: 0.31 sq mi (0.79 km^{2})
  - Water: 0.0039 sq mi (0.01 km^{2})
- Elevation: 351 ft (107 m)

Population (2020)
  - Total: 1,497
  - Density: 4,923.5/sq mi (1,900.98/km^{2})
- Time zone: UTC-5 (Eastern (EST))
  - Summer (DST): UTC-4 (EDT)
- FIPS code: 42-33154
- GNIS feature ID: 2633706

Haverford College (CDP) is a census-designated place located in Haverford Township, Delaware County, and Lower Merion Township, Montgomery County, in the U.S. state of Pennsylvania. It corresponds to the campus of Haverford College, located on the southwestern side of U.S. Route 30, approximately 10 miles (16 km) northwest of the city of Philadelphia. As of the 2010 census, the population was 1,331.

== Demographics ==
Historical population
Census	Pop.	Note	%±
2020	1,497		—
U.S. Decennial Census
