= Village Green-Green Ridge, Pennsylvania =

Unincorporated community in Pennsylvania, US

Village Green-Green Ridge
- Census-designated place
- Location in Delaware County and the U.S. state of Pennsylvania
- Coordinates: 39°51′50″N 75°25′28″W
- Country: United States
- State: Pennsylvania
- County: Delaware
- Township: Aston

Area
  - Total: 1.9 sq mi (4.9 km^{2})
  - Land: 1.9 sq mi (4.9 km^{2})
  - Water: 0.0 sq mi (0 km^{2})
- Elevation: 220 ft (67 m)

Population (2010)
  - Total: 7,822
  - Density: 4,100/sq mi (1,600/km^{2})
- Time zone: UTC-5 (EST)
  - Summer (DST): UTC-4 (EDT)
- Area code: 610
- FIPS code: 42-80218
- GNIS feature ID: 2390436

Village Green-Green Ridge is a census-designated place (CDP) in Aston Township, Delaware County, Pennsylvania, United States. The population was 7,822 at the 2010 census, down from 8,279 at the 2000 census.

== Geography ==
Village Green-Green Ridge is located in southern Delaware County at 39°51′50″N 75°25′28″W (39.864011, -75.424499), in the southern part of Aston Township. Pennsylvania Route 452 (Pennell Road) passes through the center of the CDP, leading north 3.5 miles (5.6 km) to Lima and south 3.5 miles (5.6 km) to Marcus Hook. Chester is 4 miles (6 km) to the southeast via Concord Road.

According to the United States Census Bureau, the CDP has a total area of 1.9 square miles (4.8 km^{2}), all land.

== Demographics ==
Historical population
Census	Pop.	Note	%±
2000	8,279		—
2010	7,822		−5.5%
2020	8,000		2.3%

As of the census of 2000, there were 8,279 people, 3,165 households, and 2,294 families residing in the CDP. The population density was 4,527.7 inhabitants per square mile (1,748.2/km^{2}). There were 3,218 housing units at an average density of 1,759.9 per square mile (679.5/km^{2}). The racial makeup of the CDP was 97.61% White, 0.60% African American, 0.02% Native American, 0.76% Asian, 0.02% Pacific Islander, 0.25% from other races, and 0.72% from two or more races. Hispanic or Latino of any race were 1.11% of the population.

There were 3,165 households, out of which 29.8% had children under the age of 18 living with them, 59.8% were married couples living together, 9.1% had a female householder with no husband present, and 27.5% were non-families. 24.1% of all households were made up of individuals, and 13.6% had someone living alone who was 65 years of age or older. The average household size was 2.61 and the average family size was 3.12.

In the CDP, the population was spread out, with 22.4% under the age of 18, 8.0% from 18 to 24, 27.0% from 25 to 44, 25.3% from 45 to 64, and 17.2% who were 65 years of age or older. The median age was 40 years. For every 100 females, there were 92.5 males. For every 100 females age 18 and over, there were 88.6 males.

The median income for a household in the CDP was $50,369, and the median income for a family was $62,500. Males had a median income of $44,803 versus $30,809 for females. The per capita income for the CDP was $23,373. About 2.9% of families and 3.7% of the population were below the poverty line, including 6.1% of those under age 18 and 2.4% of those age 65 or over.

== Education ==
It is in the Penn-Delco School District.
