= Bryan Lentz =

American politician

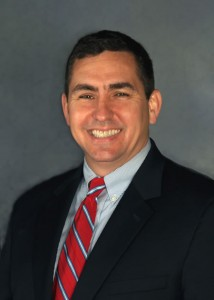

Member of the Pennsylvania House of Representatives from the 161st district
- In office January 2, 2007 – November 30, 2010
- Preceded by: Tom Gannon
- Succeeded by: Joe Hackett

Personal details
- Born: June 5, 1964 (age 62) Philadelphia, Pennsylvania
- Party: Democratic
- Spouse: Jennifer
- Education: Wissahickon High School; Valley Forge Military Academy and College; Georgetown University; Temple University
- Profession: Attorney
- Awards: Bronze Star; War on Terrorism Expeditionary Medal
- Website: Campaign website

Military service
- Allegiance: United States
- Branch/service: United States Army
- Years of service: 1986–
- Rank: Major
- Unit: 325th Airborne Infantry Regiment of the 82nd Airborne Division; 416th Civil Affairs Battalion

Bryan Roy Lentz (born June 5, 1964) is an American politician from Pennsylvania. He served as a Democratic member of the Pennsylvania House of Representatives for the 161st legislative district from 2007 to 2010. He was the 2010 Democratic nominee for U.S. Representative for Pennsylvania's 7th congressional district. He was an officer in the U.S. Army and served in the Iraq War and during peacekeeping missions in the Sinai Peninsula and Bosnia. He worked as an assistant district attorney in Philadelphia from 1993 to 1999. He led the Philadelphia Gun Violence Task Force in 2011 and currently serves as chairman of the Pennsylvania Civil Service Commission.

== Early life, education and career ==
Lentz was born in Philadelphia, Pennsylvania, to Martin and Bonnie Minehart Lentz. His father worked in 1962 to help desegregate the University of Mississippi. He graduated from Wissahickon High School and from Valley Forge Military Academy and College in 1984. He graduated with a degree in philosophy from Georgetown University in 1986 on a full army scholarship.

Lentiz is a fourth generation army veteran. After graduation, he was commissioned as a Second Lieutenant in the U.S. Army infantry and was assigned to the Second Battalion of the 325th Airborne Infantry Regiment of the 82nd Airborne Division in Fort Bragg, NC. Lentz served overseas in Iraq, where he commanded a Civil Affairs unit assisting with improving the infrastructure and rebuilding civil governance of Mosul, Iraq. Lentz also served with the Multinational Force and Observers in the Sinai Peninsula and with NATO peacekeeping missions in Bosnia. He earned the Bronze Star and the War on Terrorism Expeditionary Medal.

Lentz earned a J.D. degree from Temple University School of Law in 1993. He has worked as attorney in private practice and for six years as a prosecutor in the Philadelphia District Attorney's Office.

== Pennsylvania House of Representatives ==
In 2006, he planned to run for the United States House of Representatives in the Pennsylvania's 7th congressional district against Curt Weldon. After discussions with party officials, however, Lentz decided to bow out in favor of Rear Admiral Joe Sestak. Instead, he ran for the State House. He defeated incumbent Tom Gannon with 51.5% of the vote.

In 2008 Lentz won reelection to the State House, defeating Republican challenger Joe Hackett, and increasing his share of the vote to 55.4%.

Lentz was not a candidate for reelection to the Pennsylvania House of Representatives in 2011.

== 2010 U.S. congressional campaign ==
Lentz ran against Republican nominee Pat Meehan and American Congress Party nominee Jim Schneller.

On November 12, 2009, Lentz announced his candidacy for Pennsylvania's 7th congressional district. He sought to replace Joe Sestak, the two-term Democratic incumbent who ran for the United States Senate.

Lentz ran unopposed for the Democratic nomination in the Democratic primary on May 18, 2010.

Meehan won the general election with 54.9% of the vote, while Lentz received 44.0%; Schneller ended up with 1.1%.

=== Tea Party controversy ===
On October 19, 2010, Lentz acknowledged that he had been aware that some supporters were circulating petitions in support of Jim Schneller, a self-described "Tea Party candidate" officially running on the American Congress Party Ticket, an effort which his opponents describe as an attempt to split the conservative vote. Lentz said he did not encourage Schneller to enter the race, and that he does not believe that assisting Schneller circulate his petitions was improper.

In 2011, Lentz led the Philadelphia Gun Violence Task Force which received state funding in order to "attack the proliferation of illegal guns on city streets".

In 2016, Lentz was nominated to the Pennsylvania Civil Service Commission by Governor Tom Wolf and currently serves as chairman.

Lentz is an attorney at the law firm of Bochetto & Lentz.

Pennsylvania House of Representatives
Preceded by Tom Gannon	Member of the Pennsylvania House of Representatives from the 161st district 2007–2011	Succeeded by Joe Hackett
