= Leanne Krueger =

American politician (born 1977)

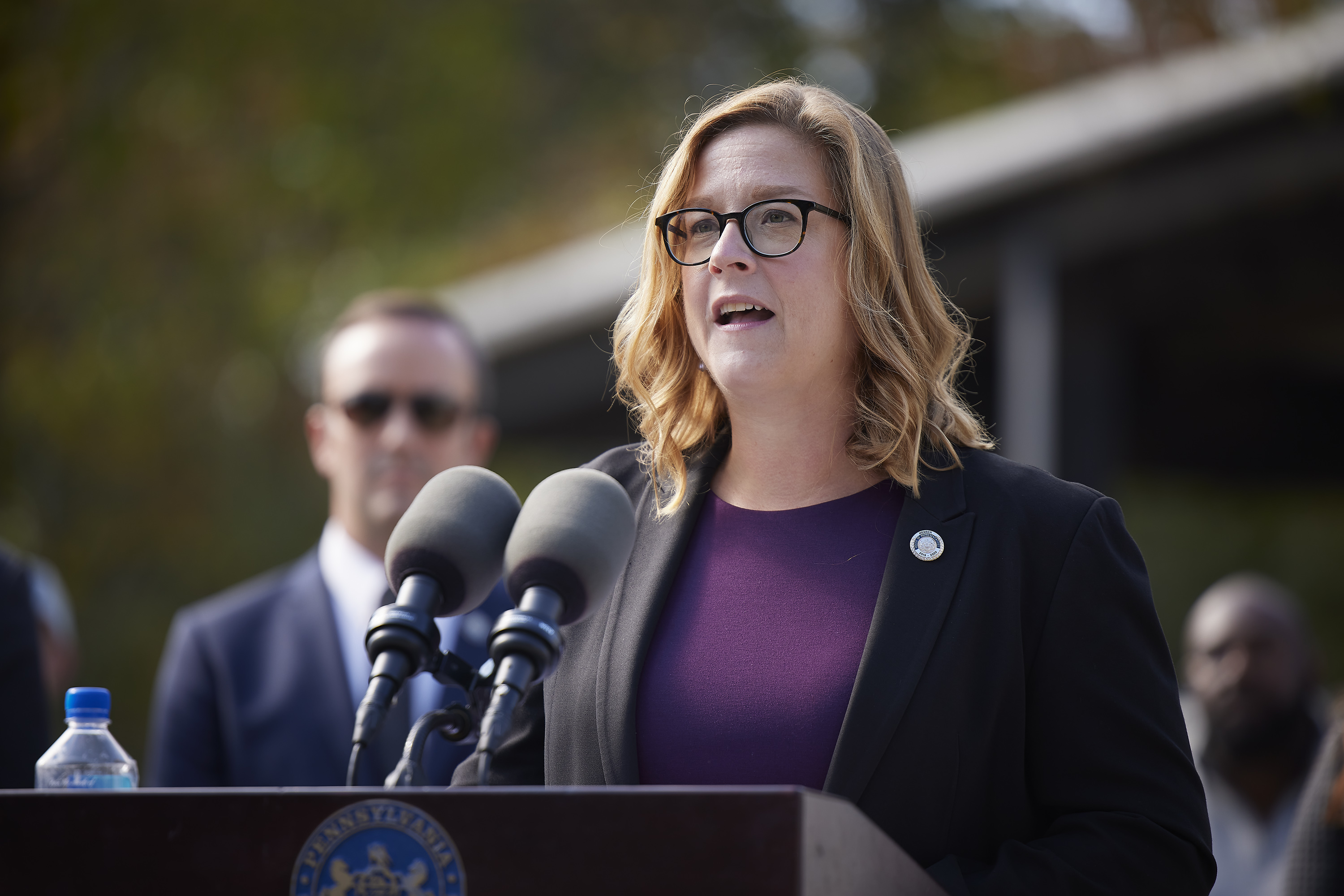

Member of the Pennsylvania House of Representatives from the 161st district
- Incumbent
- Assumed office August 25, 2015
- Preceded by: Joe Hackett

Personal details
- Born: February 14, 1977 (age 49) North Brunswick, New Jersey, U.S.
- Party: Democratic
- Children: 1
- Education: Rutgers University; Eastern University (MBA)

Leanne T. Krueger (born February 14, 1977) is an American politician from Pennsylvania currently serving as a Democratic member for the Pennsylvania House of Representative, District 161 since 2015.

== Early life and education ==
Born in North Brunswick, New Jersey, Krueger graduated from North Brunswick High School in 1995. She received her bachelor's degree from Rutgers University in 1999 and a master's degree in business administration from Eastern University in 2003. She served as the executive director of the Sustainable Business Network of Greater Philadelphia between 2004 and 2013, where she worked with local businesses to promote their growth and environmentally conscious business practices. Krueger went on to work as the senior director for strategy and development for the Business Alliance for Local Living Economies (BALLE) in 2013.

== Political career ==
In 2014, Krueger ran as a Democrat to represent the 161st district seat in the Pennsylvania House of Representatives, losing to incumbent Republican Joe Hackett.

Hackett resigned in 2015 and Krueger won the special election to fill the remainder of his term in August 2015. She was sworn in on August 25. She was reelected in 2016 and in 2018. Krueger currently sits on the Appropriations, Environmental Resources & Energy, and Labor & Industry committees.

== Personal life ==
Krueger is divorced. She lives in Wallingford, Pennsylvania, with her son, Wendell.
