= Judicial elections in Pennsylvania =

In Pennsylvania, the judiciary is chosen through partisan elections. Partisan elections involve judges political party to be listed on the ballot. The Commonwealth of Pennsylvania has not always elected judges through this process.

== History ==
The first state constitution was created in 1776, shortly after the country declared its independence from Great Britain. After heated debate over the issue, it was decided that the Pennsylvania governor would appoint state judges and justices. They served seven years, and could be replaced at any time for “misbehavior” or “maladministration.” After the seven years, they could be positioned at the same previously-held post, or replaced, depending on the wishes of the governor.

In the age of President Andrew Jackson, there was a movement within the state, and country, that all government positions should be held accountable to the will of the people, i.e. the voters. During a Pennsylvania Constitutional Convention, there were more talks about going to an elected judiciary. However, it did not have enough votes to make any substantial change; the tenure for Supreme Court justices was reduced, though, from life to fifteen years. This would mark the first step in reforming the judiciary within the Commonwealth.

In 1850, members of the General Assembly proposed legislation for an elected judiciary. The “election versus appointment” battle raged on within the state. It would not pass for another twenty years. At the 1872 Constitutional Convention, there was considerable pushback from the advocates of the appointment system. A compromise was reached – the term for Supreme Court Justices was increased from fifteen years to twenty-one years, but it was made illegal to serve more than one term. Therefore, every justice appointed would be for two decades, then replaced.

Almost a century later, at the Constitutional Convention of 1967, the issue erupted again. This time, however, the advocates of judicial elections were far more abundant. The result was to insert in the 1968 primary election a new judicial article which instituted partisan election of judges. The article passed, but critics of judicial elections claimed that the language of the article confused voters. Because of this, there was another statewide vote that spring, in which the results were much closer, but still held that people wanted to elect their judges rather than having the governor appoint them.

As of 2015, the Brennan Center for Justice lists 16 states in which the high court judges are appointed by the governor and reselected in unopposed retention elections, 15 states in which the high court judges are selected in contested nonpartisan elections, and 7 states in which the high court judges are selected in contested partisan elections.

== Pennsylvania Judicial System ==
The judiciary of Pennsylvania can be found in Article V of the State Constitution. It established a pyramid-like structure for courts, closely resembling the federal court system, with three main levels called the Supreme Court, Superior Court, and Commonwealth Court. It states that all courts are to be “united” for the common good.

The highest level is the Supreme Court. This court consists of seven justices with the Chief Justice presiding over the chamber. The middle level of the system is the intermediary appellate courts. Pennsylvania contains two intermediary appellate courts: the Superior Court of Pennsylvania and the Commonwealth Court of Pennsylvania. The Commonwealth Court has jurisdiction over appeals from decisions typically involving state agencies or cases in which the Commonwealth is a party. The Superior Court generally hears most other appeals. Both the Superior and Commonwealth courts are subservient to the Supreme Court. The Superior Court hears cases from across Pennsylvania and because there is only one Superior Court, its holdings apply statewide. The number of courts and judges are established by the Pennsylvania Constitution and law originating from the General Assembly in Harrisburg. The Court of Common Pleas is the court of general jurisdiction over many civil and criminal matters in Pennsylvania.

Before entering the main court system, usually people have to pass through magisterial district courts which are smaller-scale local courts that typically have jurisdiction over traffic citations, preliminary hearings in many criminal matters, and small claims civil cases. Typically, at least one of these exists for every judicial district, if not several depending on the size and population of the county in which the district is located. Alternatively, Philadelphia and Pittsburgh have both established municipal courts — the only municipal courts in Pennsylvania — that function in much the same way as their magisterial district court counterparts.

== Election process ==
Before judges and Justices can be elected, they must meet certain basic requirements, such as residency and citizenship. First, all judges (excluding magisterial district judges) have to be a member of the bar of the Supreme Court of Pennsylvania, which is the mandatory bar for licensed lawyers, not to be confused with the wholly voluntary Pennsylvania Bar Association. Elections occur in odd-numbered years. Every judge can run for reelection until they reach the mandatory retirement age of 75. If there is a vacancy, due to death or retirement, it is filled by gubernatorial appointment until there is another election. For the Supreme Court, Superior Court, Commonwealth Court, and Court of Common Pleas, there is a 10-year term. For magisterial district courts and municipal courts, judges serve a 6-year term. Each aspiring judge runs with their political party listed on the ballot, but after victory the party affiliation is erased from his/her name to prevent political pressures.

== Advantages and disadvantages ==
Due, among other factors, to Pennsylvania having an overwhelming number of male governors, there were few to no women in the court system. With the change in 1968, however, more women became involved in the judiciary by way of election. The people of Pennsylvania are more likely to elect women to serve as judges and justices than male governors were to appoint them. By the numbers, conservative governors never chose women to be judges, and more liberal ones appointed women about 30% of the time. In recent times, however, more than 28% of judicial seats in the Commonwealth are held by women.

The two main disadvantages often argued to counter the affirmative viewpoint is the palpable corruption within the Pennsylvania judicial system and the problems which arise from integrating politics and law, which the state founders warned against. Three separate judges, all having been elected to the Court of Common Pleas, have been involved in scandals while in office in the past ten years (one term). All have been prosecuted in Federal court, with charges ranging from bribery to the artifice to defraud.

Another problem is the mixing of politics and law. Massive amounts of money are being spent on these races, which reinforces the notion that these positions are actually political and not purely legal. During the 2015 Supreme Court elections, more than $15 million was raised and spent trying to advertise the candidates to the population, despite the low voting rate for judicial elections in the state. Because these candidates run as either Republican or Democrat, they also got help from PACs; in 2008-2009, about $2.9 million was spent by PACs on Supreme Court elections.

== Possible future revisions ==
There have been many factions in Pennsylvania that continue to push for reverting to an appointment system for judges. The increasing political emphasis on these elections, as well as the cases of corruption, are beginning to convince the population that the old system was both better for the state and more efficient. There are also talks of subsequently increasing term lengths, reducing judge's salaries, requiring more formal education, and abolishing the retirement requirement for age 75.

== See also ==
- List of first women lawyers and judges in Pennsylvania
- List of justices of the Supreme Court of Pennsylvania
