= Pennsylvania House of Representatives, District 161 =

American legislative district

Pennsylvania's 161st State House of Representatives district
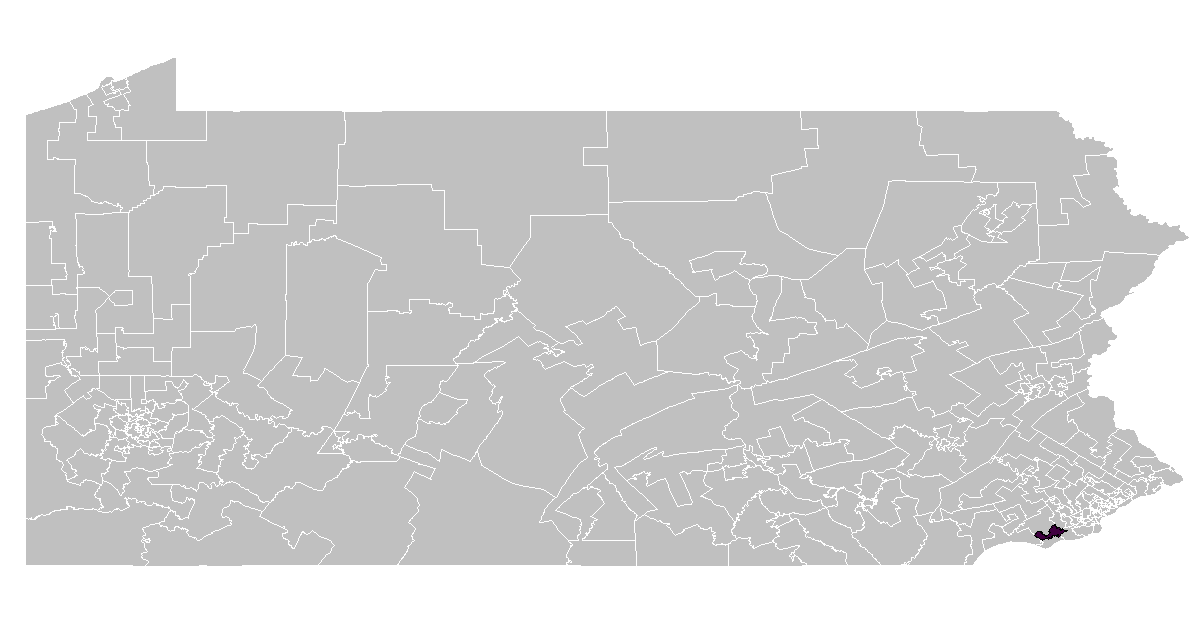
Representative
Leanne Krueger; D–Nether Providence Township
- Population (2021): 63,804

Pennsylvania House of Representatives District 161 includes part of Delaware County. It is currently represented by Democrat Leanne Krueger.

== District profile ==
The district includes the following areas:

Delaware County:

- Aston Township
- Brookhaven
- Chester Township
- Middletown Township (PART)
  - District 01
  - District 02 [PART, Divisions 01 and 02]
- Nether Providence Township
- Ridley (PART)
  - Ward 01 [PART, Divisions 01 and 03]
  - Ward 02
  - Ward 05 [PART, Division 01]
  - Ward 07
- Rose Valley
- Upland

== Representatives ==
Representative	Party	Years	District home	Note
Prior to 1969, seats were apportioned by county.
Edward B. Mifflin	Republican	1969–1971		Died January 2, 1971
Edmund Jones	Republican	1971–1974		Elected May 18, 1971, to fill vacancy
Peter J. O'Keefe	Democrat	1975–1978		
Thomas P. Gannon	Republican	1979–2006	Ridley Township	Defeated for re-election
Bryan Lentz	Democrat	2007–2010	Swarthmore	Did not seek re-election
Joseph Hackett	Republican	2011–2015	Ridley Township	Resigned effective April 30, 2015
Leanne Krueger	Democratic	2015–present	Nether Providence Township	Won special election August 4, 2015

== Recent election results ==
2022 election
Party	Candidate	Votes	%
Democratic	Leanne Krueger (incumbent)	17,958	59.4
Republican	Edward Mongelluzzo	16,589	40.6
Total votes		34,547	100.0
Democratic hold			

2020 election
Party	Candidate	Votes	%
Democratic	Leanne Krueger (incumbent)	22,764	57.0
Republican	Ralph Shicatano	17,169	43.0
Total votes		39,933	100.0
Democratic hold			

2018 election
Party	Candidate	Votes	%
Democratic	Leanne Krueger (incumbent)	18,443	59.1
Republican	Patti Rodgers Morrisette	12,775	40.9
Total votes		31,218	100.0
Democratic hold			

2016 election
Party	Candidate	Votes	%
Democratic	Leanne Krueger (incumbent)	18,218	50.8
Republican	Patti Rodgers Morrisette	17,621	49.2
Total votes		35,839	100.0
Democratic hold			

2015 special election
Party	Candidate	Votes	%
Democratic	Leanne Krueger	5,268	54.0
Republican	Paul Mullen	4,482	46.0
Total votes		9,750	100.0
Democratic gain from Republican			

2014 election
Party	Candidate	Votes	%
Republican	Joe Hackett (incumbent)	12,916	55.9
Democratic	Leanne Krueger	10,176	44.1
Total votes		23,092	100.0
Republican hold			

2012 election
Party	Candidate	Votes	%
Republican	Joe Hackett (incumbent)	17,972	52.7
Democratic	Larry DeMarco	16,137	47.3
Total votes		34,109	100.0
Republican hold			

2010 election
Party	Candidate	Votes	%
Republican	Joe Hackett	13,941	53.5
Democratic	Walter Waite	12,125	46.5
Total votes		26,066	100.0
Republican gain from Democratic			
