= Tom Gannon =

American politician (1943–2021)

Thomas P. Gannon

Member of the Pennsylvania House of Representatives from the 161st district
- In office January 2, 1979 – November 30, 2006
- Preceded by: Peter O'Keefe
- Succeeded by: Bryan Lentz

Personal details
- Born: May 5, 1943 Philadelphia, Pennsylvania
- Died: January 10, 2021 (aged 77) Upland, Pennsylvania
- Party: Republican
- Spouse: Kathleen
- Education: Temple University (BA); Widener University (JD)
- Occupation: Attorney

Thomas P. Gannon (April 5, 1943 – January 10, 2021) was an American politician from Pennsylvania who served as a Republican member of the Pennsylvania House of Representatives, District 161 from 1979 to 2006.

== Early life and education ==
Gannon was born in Philadelphia and graduated from Cardinal Dougherty High School in 1961. He earned a degree in political science from Temple University in 1968 and a J.D. from the Widener University School of Law in 1976.

== Business career ==
Gannon worked as a Contract Surety Bond Claim Attorney for Reliance Insurance Company. On December 21, 2018, Gannon was suspended from practicing law for filing multiple "meritless and frivolous appeals" over a course of 8 years in a single case.

== Political career ==
Gannon was elected as a member of the Pennsylvania House of Representatives, District 161 in 1978 and was reelected for 13 consecutive terms. He had an unsuccessful campaign in 2006 and lost to Bryan Lentz. During his tenure, he sought to eliminate insurance discrimination against persons suffering from mental illness.

Gannon was a member of the Bar of the Supreme Court of Pennsylvania, the Delaware County Bar Association and the Pennsylvania Trial Lawyer's Association, before his license was suspended.

After leaving public office, Gannon worked as an independent government affairs consultant. He died on January 10, 2021.

Pennsylvania House of Representatives
| Preceded by Peter O'Keefe | Member of the Pennsylvania House of Representatives from the 161st district 1979–2006 | Succeeded by Bryan Lentz |
