= James O'Malley =

James O'Malley may refer to:

- J. Pat O'Malley (1904–1985), English singer and character actor
- James O'Malley, perpetrator in the murder of Buddy Musso
