= Joe Hackett (politician) =

American politician

Member of the Pennsylvania House of Representatives from the 161st district
- In office January 4, 2011 – April 30, 2015
- Preceded by: Bryan Lentz
- Succeeded by: Leanne Krueger-Braneky

Personal details
- Party: Republican
- Spouse: Maureen
- Children: Joe Jr., Shawn
- Occupation: Legislator

Joseph T. Hackett (born 1959) is an American politician from Pennsylvania who served as a Republican member of the 161st District from 2011 to 2015. In the 2010 Pennsylvania House of Representatives election, Hackett won 53.5% of the vote.

== Early life and education ==
Hackett was born in Ridley Township, Pennsylvania and graduated from Cardinal O'Hara High School. He graduated from the Municipal Police Academy and Delaware County Community College. He served as an officer in the Ridley Township Police Department and as a Detective Sergeant in the Delaware County Criminal Investigative Division.

== Career ==
Hackett was elected to the Pennsylvania House of Representatives, District 161 in 2010 and reelected in 2012 and 2014.

Hackett has been primarily focused on supporting several key issues, including jobs and the economy, welfare reform, crime and public safety, and transparency and accountability in government.

On April 2, 2015, Rep. Hackett announced his resignation from the Pennsylvania House of Representatives, effective April 30, 2015. In a press release, he cited that ″in light of recent episodes and situations that have placed a strain on the relationship between police and citizens of this nation, I've realized my true passion is in law enforcement.″

Hackett works as Detective Sergeant, Criminal Investigative Unit for the Delaware County District Attorney's office.

Hackett co-founded and served as the first president of the Delaware County Law Enforcement Memorial Foundation, honoring those law enforcement personnel who died while performing their duties. He was recognized for his community service by the Veterans of Foreign Wars and Knights of Columbus, and was named the Delaware County Police Emerald Society's Man of the Year and the Delaware County Law Enforcement Man of the Year. Hackett has also served as the president and secretary of the Ridley Township Police Association, vice president of the Swarthmorewood Athletic Association, and an executive board member and Lodge Delegate for Delaware County FOP Lodge 27.

== Personal life ==
Hackett is married with two children.
