= Port of Chester =

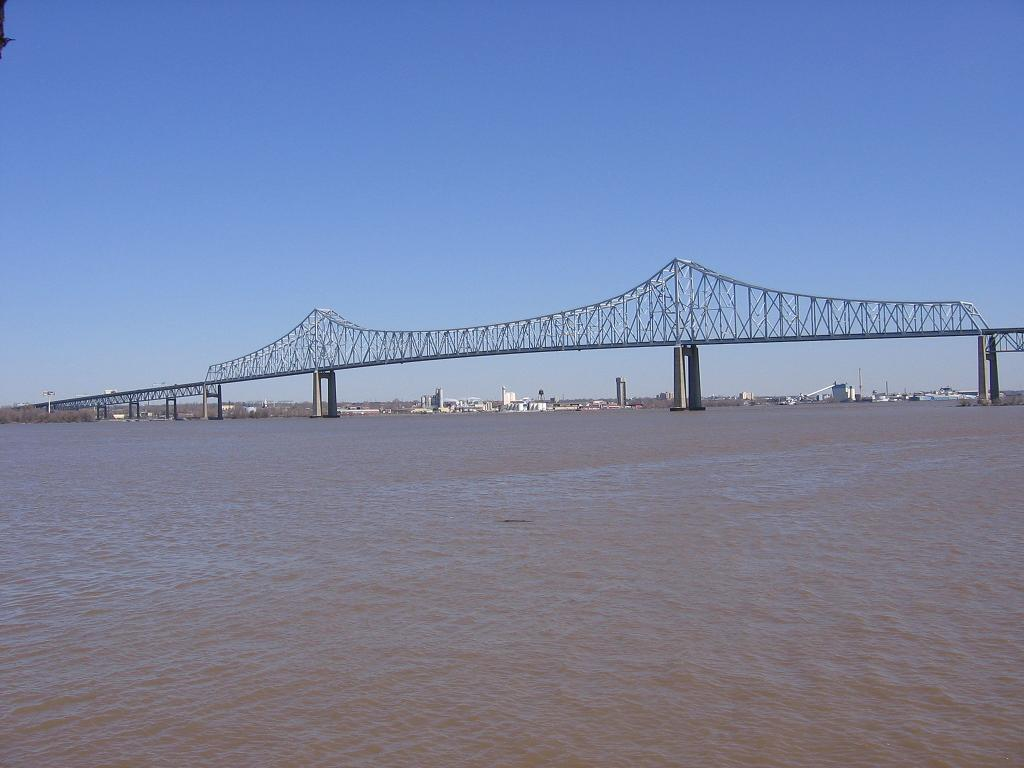
- Port of Chester seen through Commodore Barry Bridge
- Interactive map of Port of Chester

Location
- Country: United States
- Location: Chester, Pennsylvania
- Coordinates: 39.8527302°N 75.3442906°W

Details
- Draft depth: 45 feet
- Air draft: 188 feet

The Port of Chester is an American port on the west bank of the Delaware River in Delaware County, Pennsylvania. Centered around Chester, it ranges into Marcus Hook to the south and Eddystone to the north. It is part of the Delaware Valley port complex and lies between the Port of Wilmington and the Port of Philadelphia. Traditionally, shipbuilding and later automobile assembly were the mainstays of the port. It has since given way to other manufacturing and recreational activities, with Penn Terminals the only traditional maritime facility.

== History ==
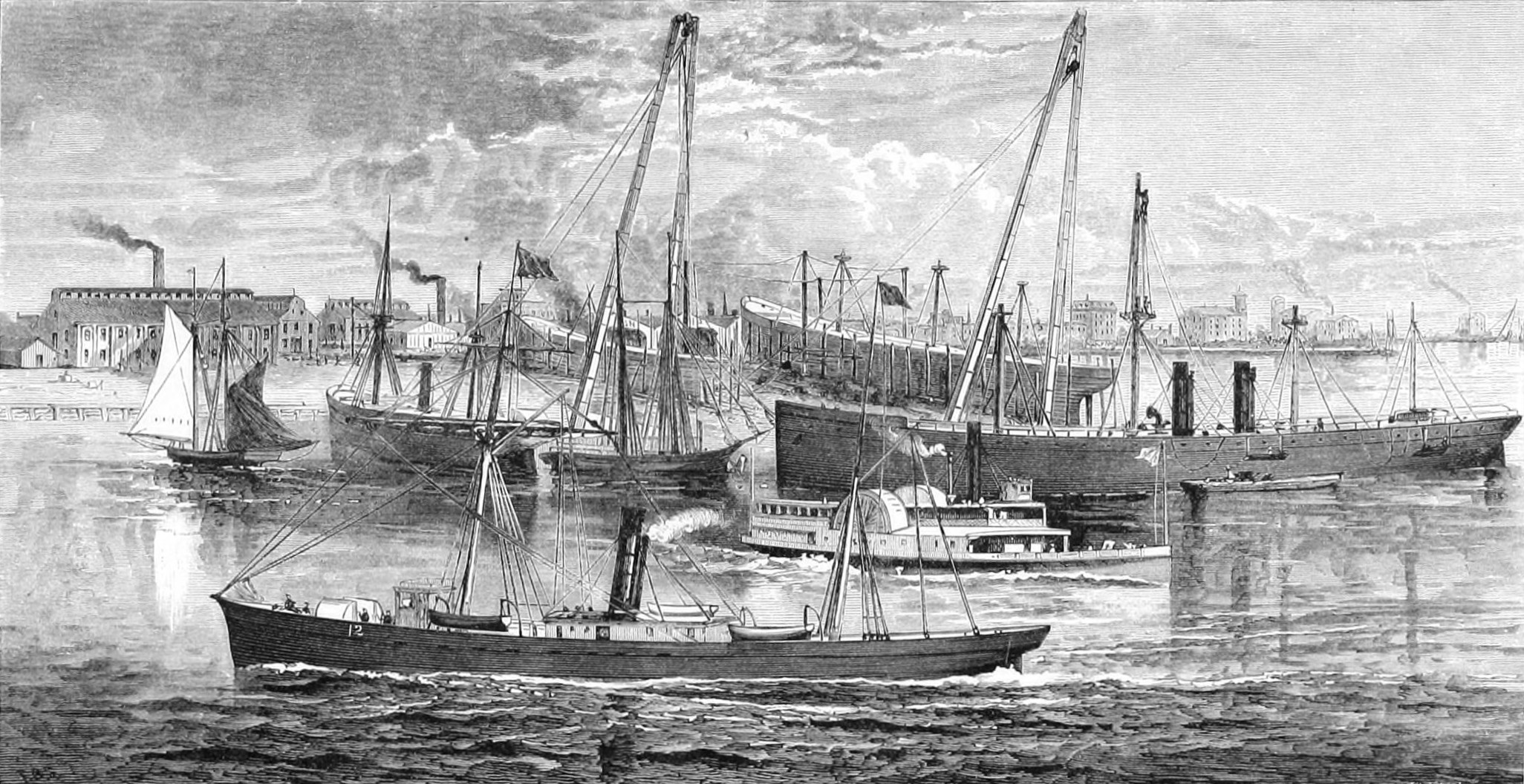
Chester waterfront ca 1875

- William Penn Landing Site is near the confluence of Chester Creek and the Delaware River.
- Sun Shipbuilding & Drydock Company - The United States' biggest post-Civil War shipyard was founded by the Sun Oil Company in 1917 as a private shipyard for production of oil tankers. During the period between the First and Second World Wars, when many other yards were shut down due to a surplus in vessels and the Great Depression, Sun maintained its building pace as the US began to move away from coal as the main source of fuel for ships, powerplants and machinery and into oil. It closed in 1990. The US Navy has named ships USS Chester in honor of the port.
- Chester Waterside Station of the Philadelphia Electric Company
- Delaware River Iron Ship Building and Engine Works and later Merchant Shipbuilding Corporation Chester shipyard, which had been in existence since 1859 and built close to 350 ships during the course of its history. It was sold to the Ford Motor Company and became a factory motor vehicles called Chester Assembly, which opened in 1927 and closed in 1961.
- Chester Rolling Mill
- Eddystone Arsenal (a division of Baldwin Locomotive Works)
- Wade Dump, a former industrial site

== Location and access ==
The waterfront is part of the Delaware Valley port complex. It is located on the west bank of Delaware River in Chester, Eddystone and Ridley Park. It is upstream of the Trainer Refinery and downstream of Philadelphia International Airport. Stoney Creek, Chester Creek, Ridley Creek, Crum Creek and Darby Creek mouth along the shore.

=== Shipping channel ===
Route 291 is known as the Industrial Heritage Highway

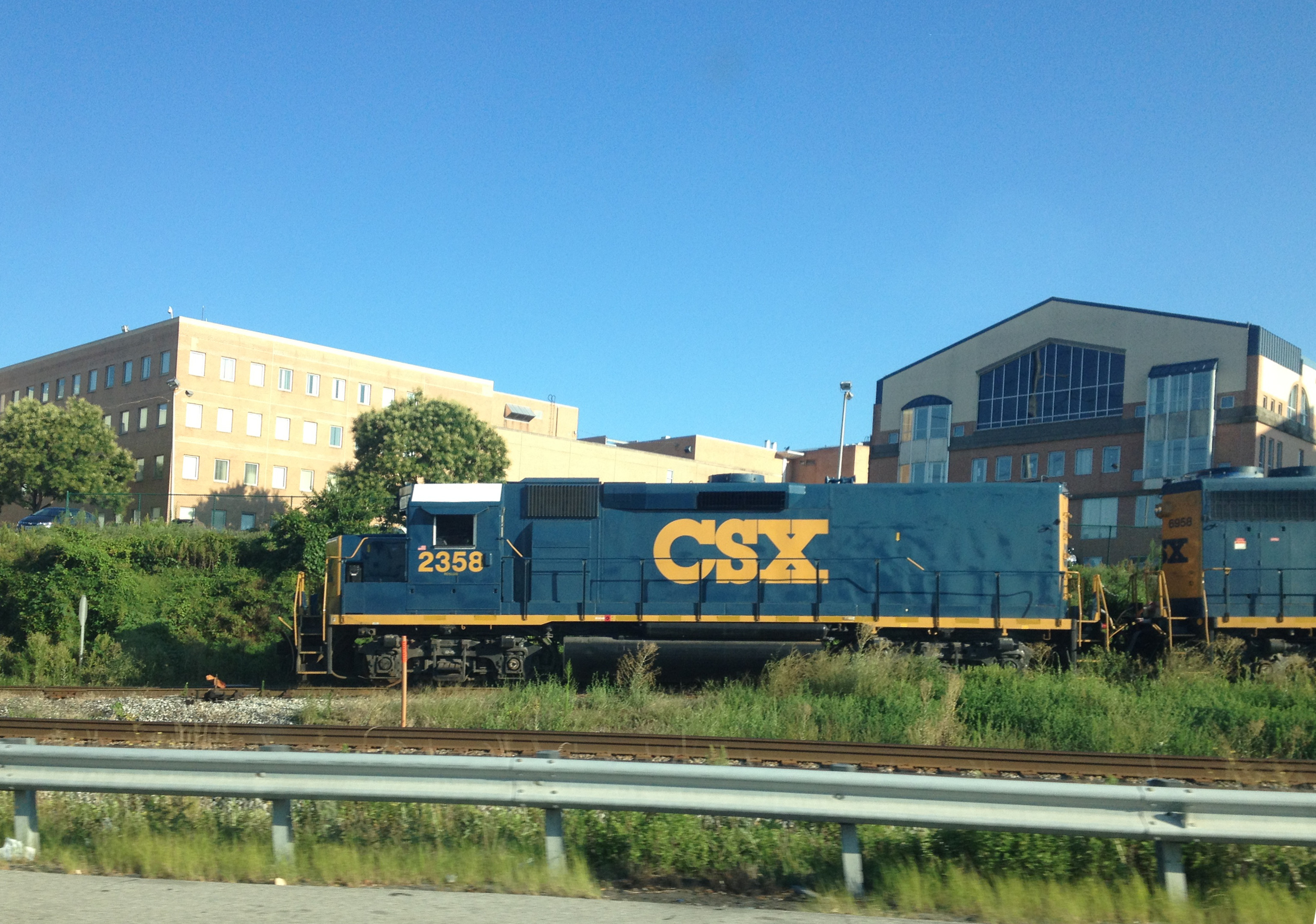
CSX Philadelphia Subdivision at Chester

In the "project of 1885" the U.S. government undertook systematically the formation of a 26-foot (7.9 m) shipping channel 600 feet (180 m) wide from Philadelphia to deep water in Delaware Bay. The River and Harbor Act of 1899 provided for a 30-foot (9.1 m) channel 600 feet (180 m) wide from Philadelphia to the deep water of the bay.

Since 1941, the Delaware River Main Channel was maintained at a depth of 40 ft (12 m). A 102.5-mile stretch of this federal navigation channel, from Port of Philadelphia and Port of Camden to the mouth of the Delaware Bay, was deepened to 45 ft (14 m), which was completed in 2017.

=== Navigational aids ===
The Marcus Hook Range Lights are range lights downstream of the port; Tinicum Island Range Lights are upstream of it. Additional navigational aids are located along the shore.

=== Roads ===
Pennsylvania Route 291 parallels the river and is known as the Industrial Heritage Highway.

The Commodore Barry Bridge carries U.S. Route 322. U.S. Route 13 also runs through Chester. Interstate 95 and Interstate 476 are nearby and intersect at Crum Lynne.

=== Rail service ===
Rail service to the port is within Conrail's South Jersey/Philadelphia Shared Assets Area, based at Pavonia Yard over Delair Bridge, the most downstream railroad bridge, crossing the Delaware at Pennsauken, New Jersey. The Stoney Creek Secondary parallels the port and has on site spurs. Norfolk Southern Railway (with connecting BNSF Railway service) and CSX Transportation Philadelphia Subdivision are also active.

The Wilmington/Newark Line, originally built by the Philadelphia, Wilmington and Baltimore Railroad, is a commuter rail line is one of the 13 lines in SEPTA's SEPTA Regional Rail network.

== Facilities ==
=== Maritime, water, energy and industrial ===
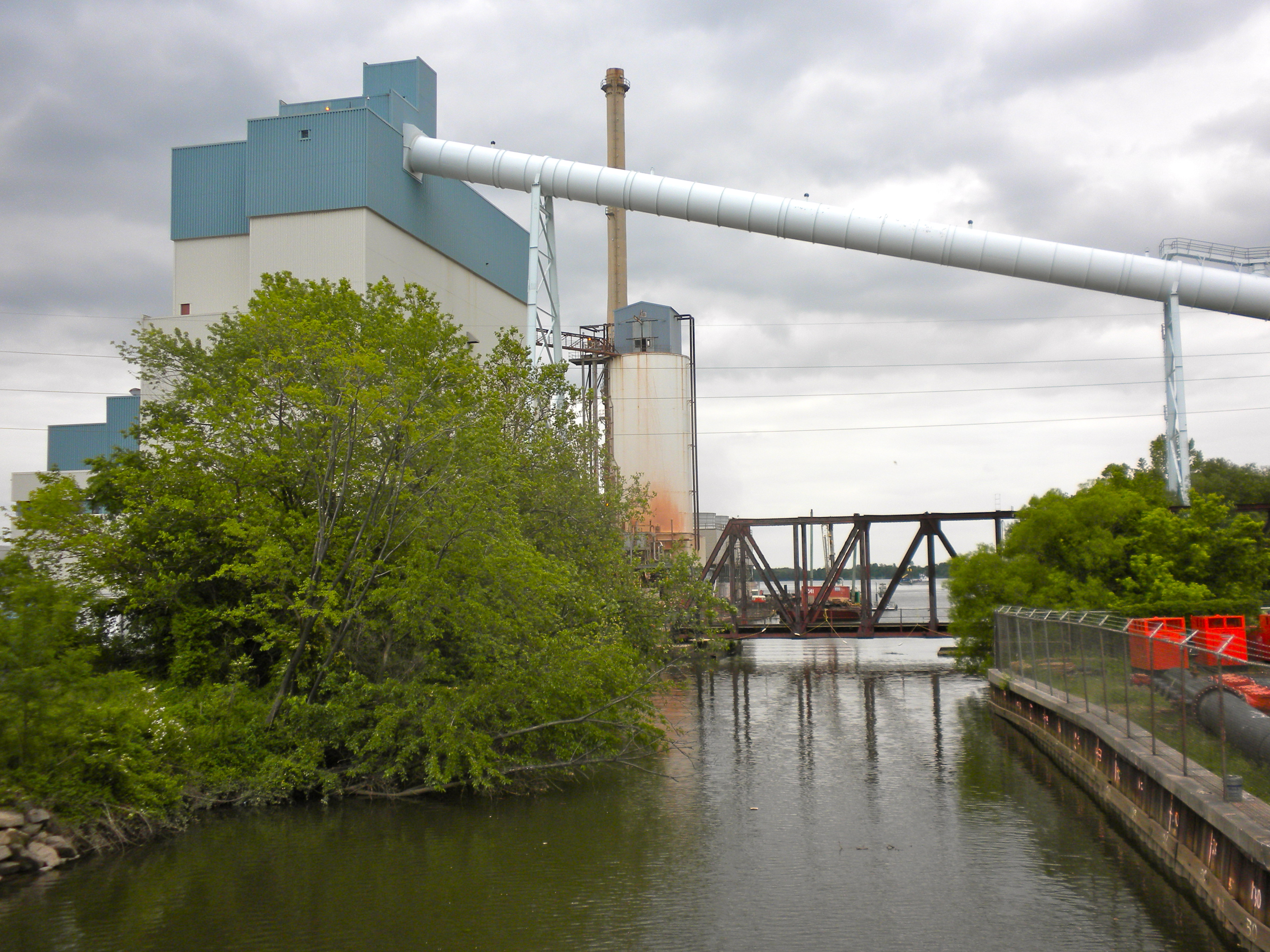
Kimberly-Clark at confluence of Chester Creek and the Delaware River

- DELCORA (Delaware County Regional Water Authority) wastewater treatment facility
- Reworld Delaware Valley Resource Recovery Facility
- Evonik Degussa
- GWSI Warehousng
- River Bridge Industrial Center
- Kimberly-Clark
- Chester Water Authority
- Penn Terminals 80 Acres (32 hectares)
- Barry Callebaut
- Exelon Eddystone Generating Station
- Boeing (formerly Boeing Rotorcraft Systems, now part of Boeing Defense, Space & Security)

=== Commercial, tourism and recreation ===
- Wharf at Rivertown
- Subaru Park is an American soccer-specific stadium is home to the Philadelphia Union of Major League Soccer. The project is the result of combined commitments of $30 million from Delaware County and $47 million from the Commonwealth of Pennsylvania. Talen Energy is the stadium's naming rights sponsor.
- Harrah's Philadelphia was built on the site of the Sun Shipbuilding & Drydock Company.
- East Coast Greenway runs along the shore.

== Gallery ==
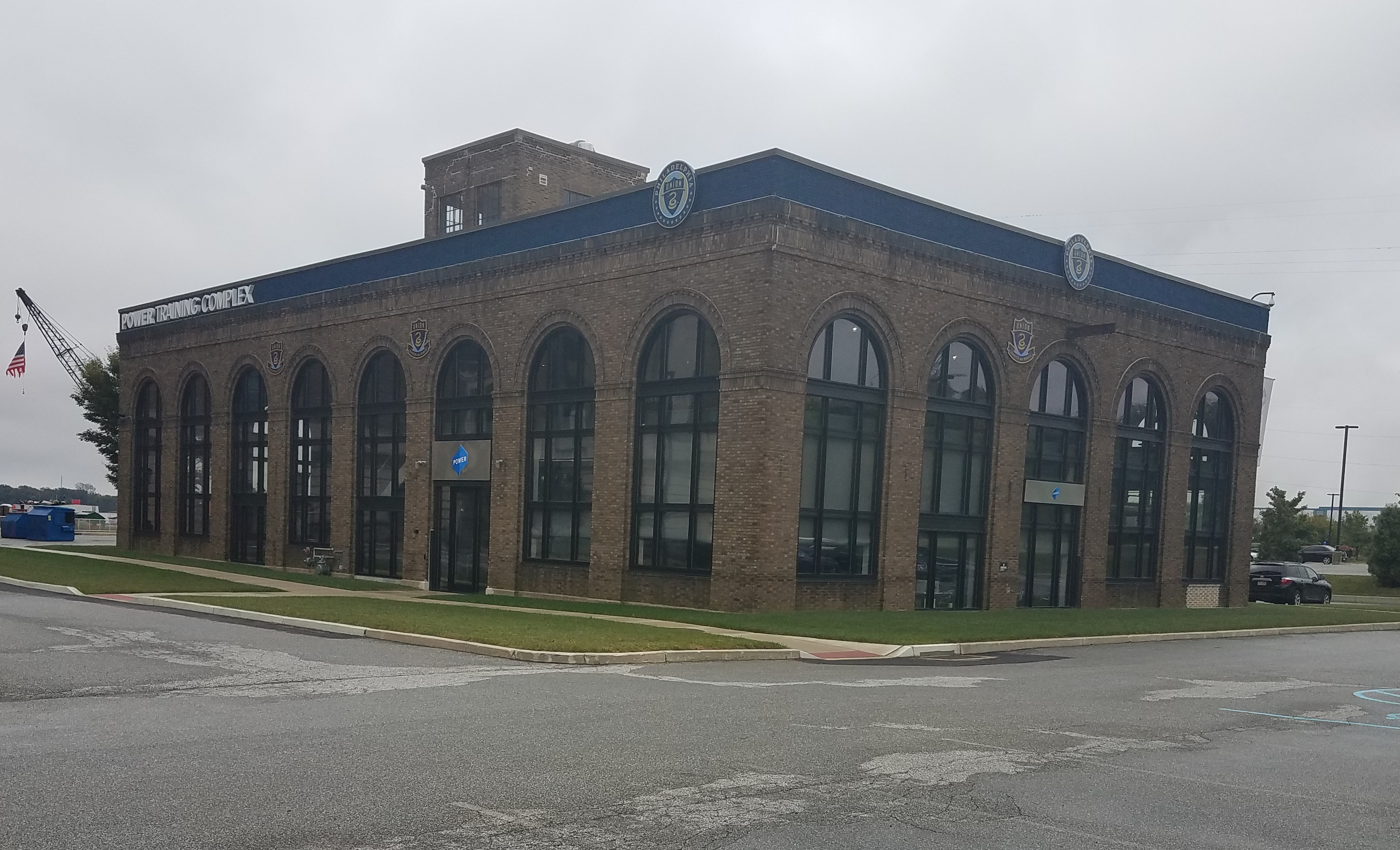
Chester Waterside Station Machine Shop now Philadelphia Union

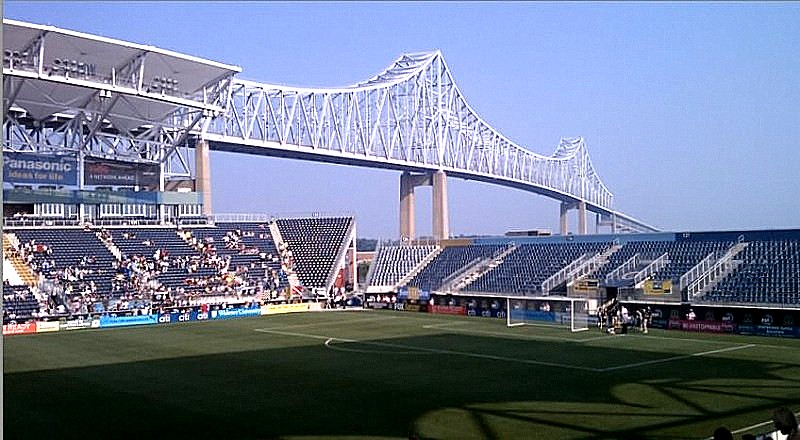
Subaru Park

Harrahs Philadelphia

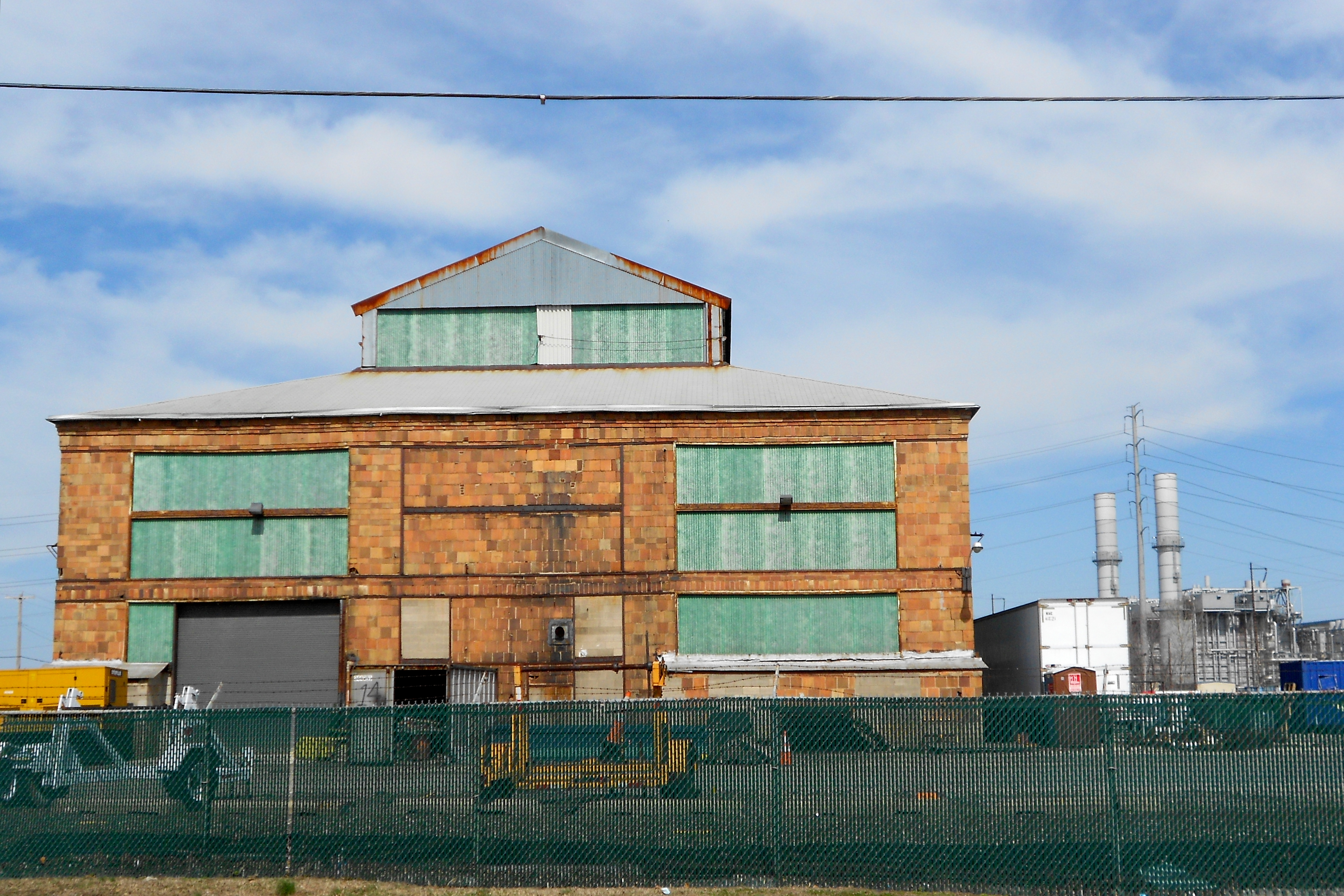
Eddystone Rifle Factory

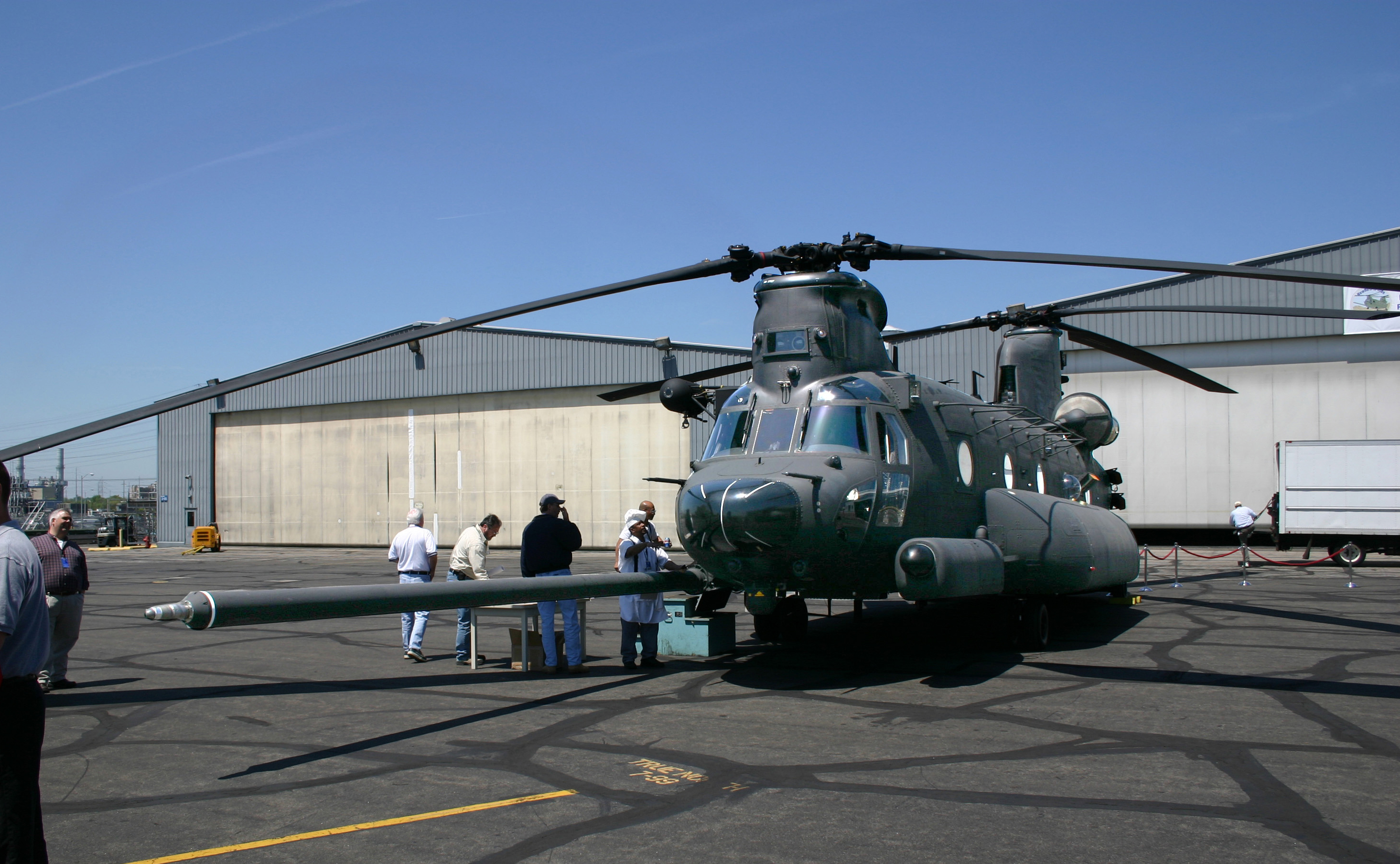
MH-47.Chinook produced at Boeing
