= Piney Point =

Piney Point may refer to:

== Places ==
- Piney Point, Maryland
- Piney Point Village, Texas

== Other uses ==
- Piney Point Formation, a geologic formation in Virginia
- Piney Point Light, an historic lighthouse in Maryland
- Piney Point phosphate plant, an industrial site in Florida
