= Jon Ruggles =

American businessman

Jon P. Ruggles
- Born: Montgomery, West Virginia, United States
- Education: University of Michigan and the University of Texas
- Occupation: Business executive
- Employer(s): McKinsey & Company Merrill Lynch Delta Air Lines North Atlantic
- Known for: Trading for Delta Air Lines fuel supply
- Spouse: Ivonne Ruggles (2003-present)

Jon Paul Ruggles (born November 28, 1973) is an American executive known for founding Monroe Energy and creating an internal trading house for Delta Air Lines that earned $420 million in trading profits in its first year. According to CNBC, Delta hired Ruggles as vice-president of fuel in 2011 to help right a fuel-hedge book that had been losing the airline money. He managed to generate notable trading returns.

Ruggles' career has been marked for being the "mastermind" behind Monroe. However, his success has been shadowed by an accusation of insider trading brought by the Commodity Futures Trading Commission (CFTC). The case signaled a turning point for the regulatory agency, as it sought to expand its regulatory reach under Rule 180.1 and develop new case law against industry-standard practices in commodities trading by using Ruggles to define insider trading regulation for the commodities industry under Misappropriation Theory.

Since his departure from Delta, Ruggles has become an investor and executive in the oil industry, working for investment firms The Carlyle Group and Silverpeak. Ruggles has been described as a "galvanizing" figure. Ruggles' career and personality have been the subject of numerous articles and books and national media coverage. Kate Kelly, a bestselling author and New York Times journalist, featured him as one of the two leading characters in her book, The Secret Club That Runs the World (2014), alongside fund manager Pierre Andurand.

== Early life ==
Ruggles was raised in Youngstown, Ohio. He is the son of a former U.S. Army sergeant who became a finance professor at Youngstown State University, and a mother who was an elementary school teacher and an artist. Ruggles attended the University of Michigan at Ann Arbor and the University of Texas at Austin graduating with studies in physics, engineering, and business. He also served in the US Army.

== Career ==
Ruggles began his early career in the energy industry, holding roles at Exxon, ConocoPhillips, and Trafigura before joining consulting firm McKinsey & Company.

In 2011, Ruggles was recruited by Richard Anderson, the then-CEO of Delta Air Lines, to lead an initiative aimed at overhauling Delta's fuel procurement strategy. Anderson envisioned Delta's fuel operations functioning like a commodity trading house and hedge fund rather than a passive price-taker. At the time, Delta was the world's largest fuel-consuming company and faced significant exposure to volatile oil prices. Ruggles received a $1 million signing bonus to take on Anderson's difficult task according to Kelly.

Ruggles recruited a team of experienced energy and derivatives traders from Wall Street firms to join Epsilon Trading. Delta implemented advanced risk management systems, expanded risk limits, and built a trading desk for more than 20 traders. Delta reported $420 million in derivatives trading profits in 2011 from Ruggles, a stark contrast to previous years where it had lost $80 million up to $1.4 billion annually through its hedging program by relying upon simplistic trading strategies. Ruggles funded the bonus pool for 80,000 employees at Delta in 2011 by making a single purely speculative trade in the heating oil market that earned more than $100 million.

Ruggles created Monroe Energy, acquiring the Trainer Refinery from ConocoPhillips for $180 million and invested over $100 million to bring the idled refinery back online. Despite initial skepticism from business media, Monroe Energy became a success, with the refinery's earnings reaching a peak of $1.2 billion in 2022.

Ruggles left Delta at the end of 2012, and is now believed to be an owner of the North Atlantic Refinery in Canada.

== Controversy at Delta ==
In 2014, CNBC broke the news that Ruggles was being investigated by the CFTC. In September 2016, Ruggles and the CFTC reached an out-of-court settlement regarding his trading activities during his tenure at Delta Air Lines. Under the terms of the settlement, Ruggles agreed to pay $3 million in fines. Ruggles did not admit to any wrongdoing and was not prosecuted criminally. He agreed to cease trading NYMEX energy futures for an indeterminate period. Delta Air Lines did not pursue any legal action against him.

In the final settlement, Ruggles' wife, Ivonne Ruggles, was not implicated or sanctioned by the CFTC. Although some trades were executed in accounts registered in her name, the CFTC's focus remained solely on Jon Ruggles, with no penalties imposed on her.

== Impact on case law and insider trading regulation of commodities ==
The Ruggles case marked a shift in insider trading regulation in commodities markets. Before the Dodd-Frank Act in 2010, the CFTC did not have regulatory power under Commodity Exchange Act (CEA) focusing only on insider misuse by CFTC personnel or individuals in exchanges under its oversight. There were no broad, market-wide prohibitions on insider trading like those enforced by the SEC in securities markets.

Harvard Law School's Forum on Corporate Governance noted:

"These cases (referring to Ruggles and one other at the time) mark a significant development in CEA enforcement. Historically, “insider trading” was not prohibited by the commodities laws. With the adoption of CEA Section 6(c)(1) and CFTC Regulation 180.1, the Commission now has broad-based authority to bring “insider trading” actions based on deceptive conduct, similar to the Securities and Exchange Commission’s (SEC’s) authority under Section 10(b) of the Securities Exchange Act and Rule 10b-5 thereunder. Nonetheless, the differences in trading between futures and securities make it unlikely that insider trading enforcement will become a centerpiece of the CFTC’s enforcement program as it is for the SEC’s."

Ruggles' did not admit wrongdoing in his settlement with the CFTC was never prosecuted criminally. The CFTC's other four test cases contemporary to Ruggles (including Bogucki) relying on Misappropriation Theory have resulted in two out-of-court settlements and two court-room losses. No Misappropriation Theory insider trading cases have been tried by the CFTC since 2019.

== Engineering and the Ruggles-Ditsch Process ==
Outside of commodity trading, Ruggles is an accomplished engineer in petroleum refining and renewable energy. He was responsible for re-engineering the Trainer Refinery to increase its yields of kerosene to be the highest jet-fuel yielding refinery in the world with double the jet producing capacity compared to typical refineries with a peak production capacity at 32%.

The expansion of this jet production in addition to a swap agreement structured by Ruggles with BP and ConocoPhillips enabled the refinery to vertically cover up to 80% of Delta's jet fuel demand:

Monroe Energy is making history by revolutionizing an industry. Focused on shifting its product slate to maximize the production of jet fuel, Monroe obtains crude from various sources and distributes product through pipelines and barges to Delta Air Lines and other strategic partners. Through direct production and exchange agreements, Monroe provides Delta with approximately 80 percent of its domestic jet fuel needs.

Ruggles is also the co-creator of the Ruggles-Ditsch Process along with his frequent technology partner Dr. Andre Ditsch (PhD, MIT 2005). The Ruggles-Ditsch Process is able to convert previously unsuitable bio-feedstocks including poultry rendered fats, algal oils, and acidic cover crop materials into renewable diesel and sustainable aviation fuel. Ruggles and Ditsch have published several patents together including:

| Patent Publication Number | Patent Name |
|---|---|
| 20240400935 | FUEL FEEDSTOCK PRODUCED THROUGH MULTISTAGE DEGUMMING AND ADSORPTIVE BLEACHING/DRYING OF LIPID-CONTAINING COMPOUNDS |
| 20240400934 | FUEL FEEDSTOCK PRODUCED THROUGH ACID DEGUMMING AND ADSORPTIVE BLEACHING/DRYING OF LIPID-CONTAINING COMPOUNDS |
| 20240400911 | PROCESSING LIPID-CONTAINING COMPOUNDS FOR FUEL FEEDSTOCK THROUGH CHELATE DEGUMMING AND ADSORPTIVE BLEACHING/DRYING |
| 20240400937 | FUEL FEEDSTOCK PRODUCED THROUGH CHELATE DEGUMMING AND ADSORPTIVE BLEACHING/DRYING OF LIPID-CONTAINING COMPOUNDS |
| 20240400936 | PROCESSING LIPID-CONTAINING COMPOUNDS FOR FUEL FEEDSTOCK THROUGH ACID DEGUMMING AND ADSORPTIVE BLEACHING/DRYING |
| 20240400933 | PROCESSING LIPID-CONTAINING COMPOUNDS FOR FUEL FEEDSTOCK THROUGH MULTISTAGE DEGUMMING AND ADSORPTIVE BLEACHING/DRYING |
