= Lick Run (Clinton County, Pennsylvania) =

Tributary in Clinton County, Pennsylvania

Coordinates: 41°10′12″N 77°30′57″W

Lick Run is a 17.2-mile-long (27.7 km) tributary of the West Branch Susquehanna River in Clinton County, Pennsylvania in the United States.

It is Pennsylvania Scenic River, so designated on December 17, 1982. Along with West Branch Lick Run, Robbins Run, Campbell Run, Staver Run, and Craig Fork, the designated scenic river encompasses 22.95 river miles. The streams are located in Clinton County, Pennsylvania.

== See also ==
- List of rivers of Pennsylvania
