= Stony Creek (Susquehanna River tributary) =

Waterway in Pennsylvania, United States

Coordinates: 40°21′50″N 76°55′49″W

Stony Creek (also known as Stoney Creek or Rausch Creek) is a 23.0-mile-long (37.0 km) tributary of the Susquehanna River in Dauphin County, Pennsylvania, in the United States.

Stony Creek joins the Susquehanna River at the borough of Dauphin.

Stony Creek is a designated Pennsylvania Scenic River from its headwaters to the gate of Pennsylvania State Game Lands 211. Included in this designation are three smaller tributary streams: Rattling Run, Rausch Creek and Yellow Springs.

Stony Creek was so named from its stony river bed.

== Tributaries ==
- Rattling Run (Stony Creek)
- Rausch Creek (Stony Creek)
- Yellow Springs (Pennsylvania)

== See also ==
- List of rivers of Pennsylvania
- Stoney Creek (Delaware River tributary)
