= Phil L. Rinaldi =

American Serial Entrepreneur in Refining

Philip L. Rinaldi OMRI
- Born: August 2, 1946 (age 80)
- Education: Chemical Engineering
- Alma mater: New Jersey Institute of Technology
- Occupations: Founder and Former President and CEO of Philadelphia Energy Solutions (2012-2017); Founder and Former CEO of CVR
- Known for: Media dubbed him "Fossil Phil" for trying to create the Philadelphia Energy Hub
- Spouse: Susan McGill (m. 1968-present)
- Children: 2, Marcus and Julian

Philip "Phil" L. Rinaldi is the founder and former CEO of Philadelphia Energy Solutions, the largest oil refinery located on the US East Coast, and the founder of Coffeyville Resources. He has been the CEO of Seminole Fertilizers, Mulberry Resources, National Zinc, and was a senior vice president for TOSCO. He is a serial entrepreneur in oil refining and started with fellow serial entrepreneur Thomas O'Malley at Phibro in the 1980s, together they launched the largest merchant refining company in the world in the 1980s–1990s in TOSCO. Later, Rinaldi was the key player behind the purchase of the former Sunoco Philadelphia Refinery, the largest oil company in the US East Coast, and worked directly with the Obama administration to complete the transaction. He was dubbed "Fossil Phil" by the media for his push to make Philadelphia a large integrated energy hub to process and export oil and gas produced in the Marcellus and Bakken regions.

== Education and early career ==
Rinaldi was raised in Belleville New Jersey. He earned his BS and MS in chemical engineering from New Jersey Institute of Technology in 1968 and 1976, respectively. As an undergraduate he served as president of Theta Chi fraternity, president of the Inter-fraternity Council and president of the Class of 1968. Mr. Rinaldi is a member of Omicron Kappa Delta National Leadership Honor Society and Omega Chi Epsilon Chemical Engineering Academic Honor Society. In 2017 he was awarded an Honorary Degree of Doctorate of Science from New Jersey Institute of Technology.

His professional career started with Exxon where he left in 1980 to co-found Phibro Resources Corporation with Tom O'Malley as an energy and natural resource development subsidiary of the Phibro-Salomon Brothers merchant bank. He left Phibro to work as a senior executive for Tom O'Malley's purchase of TOSCO when it was a single-asset company and helped grow it into becoming the third largest refiner in the United States.

== Mulberry & Piney Point ==
In 1988, Rinaldi and his partners conducted a $260 million buyout of W.R. Grace's phosphate business based in Polk County, Florida, and named it Seminole Fertilizer. Later, Rinaldi's Seminole merged with French investor Judas Azuelos's US fertilizer business which had purchased a 700-acre site known as the Piney Point phosphate plant on the south shore of Tampa Bay. Rinaldi became the president and CEO of Mulberry Phosphates, the new name for the merged entity. In January 2001, after a string of poor financial results, and after giving warning to regulators, the company walked away from the site and declared bankruptcy in February 2001.

A top state regulator called Piney Point "one of the biggest environmental threats in Florida history." State officials fear the waste will spill into Tampa Bay, killing millions of fish and destroying plant life for miles.

Fertilizer plants like Piney Point produce large volumes of low-level radioactive waste due to the concentrating effect of natural radiation emitting radium found in the rocks that also contain phosphates. Radium will decay to radon, which is hazardous. This concentrated byproduct, which is enriched by a ratio of roughly 4-to-1 during the production of mono and diammonium phosphate fertilizers is called phosphogypsum (calcium sulfate) and has historically been used as a road bed material and as a concrete blending agent like fly-ash. However in 1989 the EPA banned these co-product uses of phosphogypsum. To dispose of it, the phosphate industry stacks it into large mounds often covering hundreds of acres and sitting more than 100 feet tall. Piney Point's two phosphogypsum stacks are 50 to 70 feet high. Ongoing maintenance, primarily contact water treating and disposal, in addition to civil engineering management of the structure of the gypsum stack are required. The bankruptcy and walk-away by the management team of the gypsum stacks at Piney Point remain highly controversial. In 2021, twenty years after Mulberry's bankruptcy, disaster struck with hundreds of millions of gallons of toxic effluent water leaking from the plant site into Tampa Bay causing a red-tide. The state of Florida has quoted a spend of $185 million to manage the legacy of Mulberry's Piney Point site and intends to have it be fully closed by the end of 2024. As of October 9, 2024, the EPA was still in the process of approving the final end-plan for the closure and redeployment of phosphogypsum from Mulberry's Piney Point facility.

== Coffeyville Resources ==
In 2004, Rinaldi purchased the Farmland Industries' 118,000 bpd refinery and ammonia fertilizer chemical business located in Coffeyville, KS for $281 million. The sale was executed as a part of Farmland's bankruptcy auction process and "cleared the way for the bankrupt company, once the largest farmer-owned cooperative in North America, to pay about 60,000 creditors." Rinaldi paid $22 million in upfront cash, assumed $174 million in liabilities, and relied on Goldman Sachs to provide $85 million to purchase working capital for the transaction. Pegasus Capital backed Rinaldi and his management team.

A year later in July 2005, Rinaldi was able to sell the Coffeyville business to an affiliate of Goldman Sachs for $700 million, creating a substantial return for his $22 million of leveraged investment. At the time it was hailed as the "quickest and most profitable sale in the history of oil refining".

Rinaldi was sued by GAF Holdings LLC with active court cases running until 2009 (via several appeals) regarding the Farmland Industrial bankruptcy and his purchase of the business. Rinaldi was accused of conspiring with the then-president of Farmland's refining and chemical division of lowering the purchase price. GAF had pursued the purchase of Farmland in the years prior to its bankruptcy. The courts found in Rinaldi's favor including in the 8th Circuit Appellate Court.

The refinery is known as the CVR Coffeyville Refinery today and is still in operation and is majority owned (66%) by Carl Icahn.

== Philadelphia Energy Solutions "PES" ==
In 2012, Rinaldi led a buyout of the troubled 355,000 bpd Sunoco Philadelphia refinery encompassing 1,300 acres with The Carlyle Group as its financial backer although Rinaldi was the largest private shareholder with a stake in excess of $24 million according to PES's S-1 Registration Statement. The refinery was purchased for a near-zero price. Rinaldi turned the fortunes of the refinery around over the next four years and initiated a program to use the refinery as the anchor for a larger energy park in southern Philadelphia and to take the company and its logistics division public via an initial public offering in 2014 and 2015 respectively. The $1.3 billion IPO effort was suspended later in 2016 “given the market environment, with both very low refining profitability coupled with tight Bakken spreads, it was going to be a hard story to sell to investors. I don’t think that’s a surprise,” said Matthew Blair, an equity research analyst at Tudor, Pickering & Holt. In 2015, PES had postponed an initial public offering in August 2015 after investors balked at the price per share.

In his role as the CEO of the largest east-coast refinery, Rinaldi became one of the most vocal critics of the USA's Renewable Fuels Standard program. He stated that independent refiners like PES do not have the ability to cross-subsidize their operations in light of the RFS as compared to integrated refiners Like Valero. He fought against the Obama Administration's attempt to end the domestic crude oil export ban for US crude oil production in 2015 and appeared on CNBC to lobby for the ban's preservation. In addition, Rinaldi became a major proponent of developing LNG exports from Philadelphia by using the PES asset as the central asset of a major energy complex.

In 2017 Rinaldi retired from Philadelphia Energy Solutions, and handed off the role of CEO to Philadelphia Energy Solution's Chief Administrative Officer & SVP of Finance, Greg Gatta. Refining veteran Mark Smith replaced Greg Gatta as CEO in March 2019.

The subsequent effects of poor maintenance and lack of reinvestment led to a series of damaging fires including the 2019 Philadelphia Refinery Explosion, and ultimately closed the refinery in 2019 and led to the bankruptcy and dissolution of PES. Its bankruptcy was challenged in the courts for more than year with the community leadership of Philadelphia becoming involved with an estimated $16 billion of economic impact at stake.

Rinaldi formed a competing company in 2019 to purchase the PES estate from bankruptcy with the intent of restarting the refinery and also building a renewable fuels business in Philadelphia. The attempted restart of the PES Refinery by Rinaldi was deeply contested with environmentalists and employees being on opposite sides of the issue:

Joe Minott, executive director of Philadelphia Clean Air Council, said he doesn’t trust Rinaldi’s new green intentions. "I don’t think Mr. Rinaldi has any idea what going green means, what clean energy means, and I would not trust that he would really move forward with something that was acceptable to the community and would benefit the environment in the Philadelphia area,” Minott said. “Phil Rinaldi would be a terrible choice to do anything with the old refinery,” he added. “While he was a head of PES, I think he essentially destroyed the company and created the mess that it is today.” Ryan O’Callaghan, president of United Steelworkers Local 10-1, which represented union workers at the refinery, said he had many conversations with Rinaldi and thinks his proposal is very promising. “We’re familiar with Phil, he’s a good man. He had a vision last time [when he created PES], and it seems like he has a vision this time,” O’Callaghan said.

Ultimately, a federal judge approved a $252 million bid from Hilco Redevelopment Partners to demolish the 1300-acre site in 2020 even though Rinaldi's bid was $25 million higher in value.

== "Fossil Phil" and the Philadelphia energy hub ==
Rinaldi was the architect behind the concept of turning Philadelphia into a major energy hub, creating a competitor to the Houston/Port Arthur/New Orleans complex. The PES Refinery would serve as the base of energy aggregation, along with the large former Sunoco Marcus Hook Refinery in south Philadelphia. The hub would import energy from the Marcellus Shale region (of Western Pennsylvania) and the Bakken Region in North Dakota. Several different businesses would collocate to process crude oil, create petrochemicals, generate electricity, and export natural gas liquids, chemicals, and LNG. Rinaldi envisioned new pipelines, plants, generation stations, and modern steel and metals factories being constructed to the hub as part of the development. Rinaldi chaired the Chamber of Commerce's Action Team to develop the hub. He also led a $500 million investment to create the fastest rail offloading terminal in the United States for crude delivery from the Bakken region which is opened alongside Governor Corbett of Pennsylvania. The facility could offload up to 160,000 barrels of crude oil per day with 240 cars stretching 3 miles long.

Rinaldi was actively opposed by many institutions in Philadelphia, including faculty members at several of Philadelphia's universities who combined with Green Justice to oppose energy projects in Philadelphia. He was given the moniker "Fossil Phil" in the press and protestors carried signs with the name in prominent areas of Philadelphia.

In addition, Philadelphia’s Democratic delegation to the Pennsylvania legislature urged the Philadelphia Regional Port Authority to reject plans for fossil fuel projects. Community activists used Rinaldi to mobilize dissent including politicians.

“They lost the confidence of the public and a variety of very mobilized constituents to have what is often referred to as a social license – the confidence of people who are not directly benefiting but who are part of a city or region or state,” said Mark Alan Hughes, director of the University of Pennsylvania’s Kleinman Center for Energy Policy.

After the collapse of the PES Refinery, and the following the shutdowns of the Eagle Point, Marcus Hook, and the two Paulsboro Refineries, Philadelphia is no longer a major refining center in the United States. Only Monroe Energy continues to operate in the region, reducing what was the fourth-leading refining hub (behind Houston, New Orleans, and Los Angeles) in the United States for nearly 100-years to become a minor industry player.

== Other activities and awards ==
Rinaldi served as Chairman Emeritus of the Board of Trustees for his alma mater the New Jersey Institute of Technology. He was selected for the 2019 NJIT Alumni Achievement Award. He is a founding director of the NJIT Alumni Association and has endowed the Louis and Marie Carmella Rinaldi Scholarship in honor of his parents.

Rinaldi has also been a member of the Board of Directors at United Way of Greater Philadelphia & Southern New Jersey and a member of the Board of Directors of the National Italian American Foundation. He is also the recipient of the 2015 Global Business Leadership Award from the World Trade Center of Greater Philadelphia. In 2016 he was honored by the American Heart Association and received the Heart of Philadelphia award for his help in raising over $2 million for the organization.

Mr. Rinaldi was also a member of the Drexel University College of Engineering Advisory Council; a Board Director and Executive Committee member of the Greater Philadelphia Chamber of Commerce; a Board Member of the Greater Philadelphia CEO Council for Growth; and a Board Director of the Pennsylvania State Chamber of Business and Industry.

In 2017 Rinaldi was awarded the title of Cavaliere Ordine al Merito della Repubblica Italiana by Italian President Sergio Mattarella.
