= 2019 Philadelphia refinery explosion =

Hydrofluoric acid spill and industrial fire

Philadelphia Energy Solutions refinery explosion
- PES Refinery (Philadelphia)
- Date: June 21, 2019
- Time: 04:00 AM EDT
- Location: Philadelphia, Pennsylvania; 39°54′11.4″N 75°12′32.2″W
- Type: Vapor cloud fire leading to three explosions, of which one boiling-liquid expanding-vapor explosion (BLEVE)
- Deaths: 0
- Injuries: 5

In the early morning of June 21, 2019, a fire and multiple explosions occurred at the Philadelphia Energy Solutions (PES) refinery in Philadelphia, Pennsylvania. A release of hydrocarbons and hydrofluoric acid in the refinery's alkylation unit caused a ground-hugging vapor cloud which rapidly ignited, leading to three separate explosions minutes apart from each other. The largest explosion, a BLEVE, sent a vessel fragment flying 2,000 feet (610 m) across the Schuylkill River. Five employees sustained minor injuries, but there were ultimately no fatalities. The refinery announced it would shut down operations the same month, and filed for bankruptcy a month later.

== Background ==
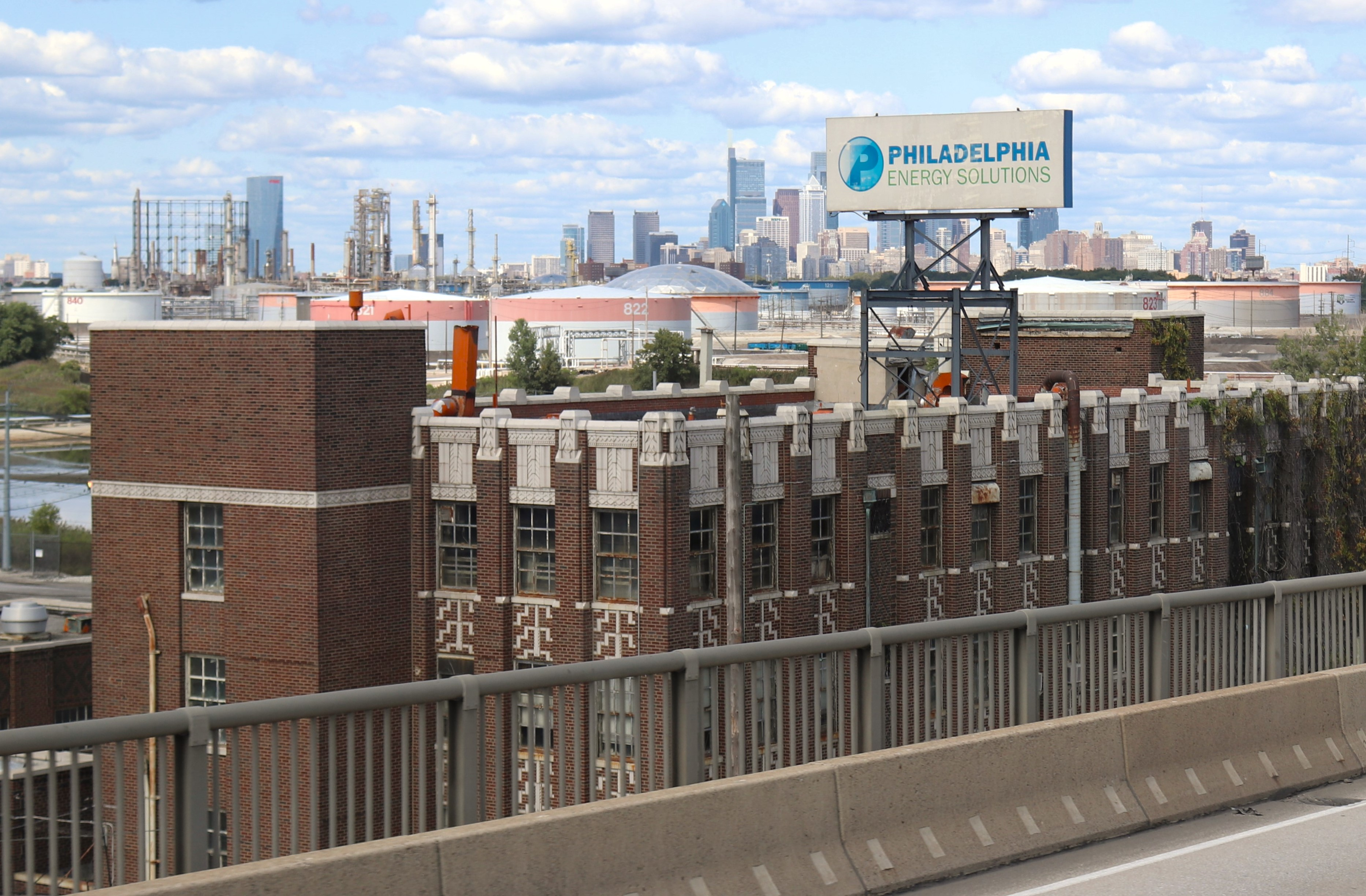
Sign identifying the refinery, taken from Penrose Avenue looking north

The Philadelphia Energy Solutions refinery was an oil refinery complex in Philadelphia. It was first used in 1866 by the Atlantic Petroleum Storage Company, who built the complex to store and transport petroleum and its byproducts. By 1870, the company had become Philadelphia's largest employer and a leader in exporting lighting fuel. To meet growing demands, the Gulf Oil Company built a second refinery at Girard Point by the 1920s.

The neighborhood surrounding the refinery sites, largely farms and marshlands, began to develop housing and transportation infrastructure as the refineries expanded. The construction of the Schuylkill Expressway and Platt Bridge transformed the area into a major transportation crossroads. Public housing was built by the Philadelphia Housing Authority and federal government, including directly across from the highway.

The current refinery site resulted from the integration of the Girard Point and Point Breeze refineries under Sunoco. Unable to afford changes that would allow the refinery to process cheaper crude oils, the refinery relied on expensive imported oils that put it at a comparative disadvantage. After Sunoco announced their intent to close or sell the complex, Philadelphia Energy Solutions was founded by Phil Rinaldi to buy and maintain operations.

== Fire, explosions, and emergency response ==
On the morning of June 21, 2019, the refinery's alkylation unit, which produced high-quality gasoline, was functioning normally. However, shortly after 4:00 am, a leak of liquefied hydrocarbon gas (mostly propane) containing about 2.5% hydrofluoric acid (HF) developed from a ruptured pipe elbow at the discharge of a pump. At the time, three field operators were working in the alkylation unit. At 4:01 am, one of the operators reported seeing a ground-hugging vapor cloud, estimated by another to be 10 feet (3.0 m) high. At 4:02 am, the vapor cloud ignited in the unit, causing a massive fire. The field operators in the alkylation unit were able to flee the area and avoid injury.

At 4:03 am, a remote control room operator activated the refinery's rapid acid deinventory (RAD) system, routing approximately 339,000 pounds (154,000 kg) of hydrofluoric acid into an isolated drum for sequestration and safety. At 4:12 am, the control room operator attempted to activate the water cannons which were designed to reduce airborne HF through vapor suppression, but the system failed to respond. In fact, the associated control system had failed at 4:02 am, and its backup uninterruptible power supply failed 9 seconds afterwards. One field operator attempted to walk to the water pumps to manually activate them but reported they were too hot at the time to approach.

At 4:15 am, the first explosion occurred in the alkylation unit, followed by a second explosion at 4:19 am. Then, at 4:22 am, a vessel containing flammable hydrocarbons (primarily butylene, isobutane, and n-butane) ruptured and caused the largest blast, a boiling liquid expanding vapor explosion (BLEVE). Fragments of the vessel, one weighing approximately 38,000 pounds (17,000 kg) and two other fragments weighing approximately 15,500 pounds (7,000 kg) and 23,000 pounds (10,000 kg), were sent flying; the largest fragment was propelled 2,000 feet (610 m) across the Schuylkill River.

At 4:39 am, the alkylation unit shift supervisor entered the alkylation unit in firefighting protective bunker gear and manually activated the water pumps to help suppress the release of hydrofluoric acid from the alkylation unit.

Residents who lived east of the plant were ordered to shelter in place. The fire burned for over 24 hours before it was extinguished at approximately 8:30 am on June 22, 2019, and the shelter-in-place order was lifted.

== Investigation and shutdown ==
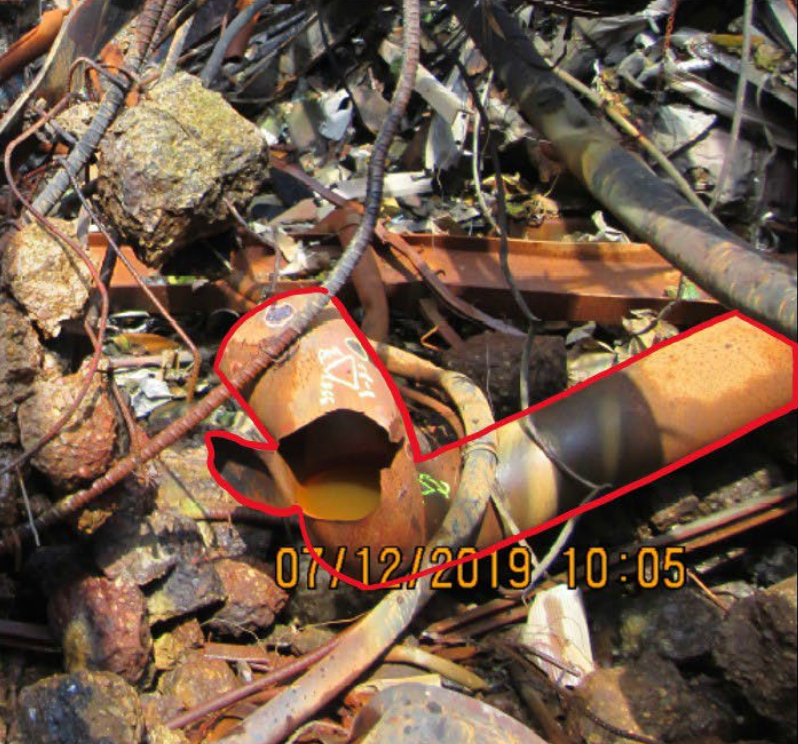
Ruptured elbow pipe from Philadelphia Energy Solutions refinery, determined to be the root cause to the refinery's fire and explosions in June 2019

The U.S. Chemical Safety Board released its final report on the incident on October 11, 2022. The report stated that a corroded elbow pipe, installed in 1973, ruptured and caused the initial leak. PES announced it would halt operations completely on June 26, 2019, and filed for bankruptcy on July 22. The shutdown reduced US refining capacity by about 2%. As of 2022, developers were looking into redeveloping the site of the refinery.

== Environmental Protection Agency Settlement ==
On October 8, 2024, the United States Environmental Protection Agency (EPA) announced it had reached a settlement of $4.2 million with Philadelphia Energy Solutions. In the settlement, the EPA found that the company had failed to identify and assess the risk posed by a pipe elbow in the hydrofluoric acid alkylation unit. Last installed in 1973, the pipe ruptured due to "extensive" corrosion.

The EPA states that the lawsuit marked the largest amount sought under the Clean Air Act Rule, which requires owners to ensure that hazardous substances are safely managed. However, the company did not admit to liability in the settlement plan.

The claim was filed in a U.S. Bankruptcy Court in Delaware following the company's declaration of bankruptcy after the explosion. Philadelphia Energy Solutions remains under a clean-up agreement in collaboration with the EPA and Pennsylvania Department of Environmental Protection.
