= Tucquan Creek =

Watercourse in Pennsylvania, US

Coordinates: 39.878895°N 76.287322°W

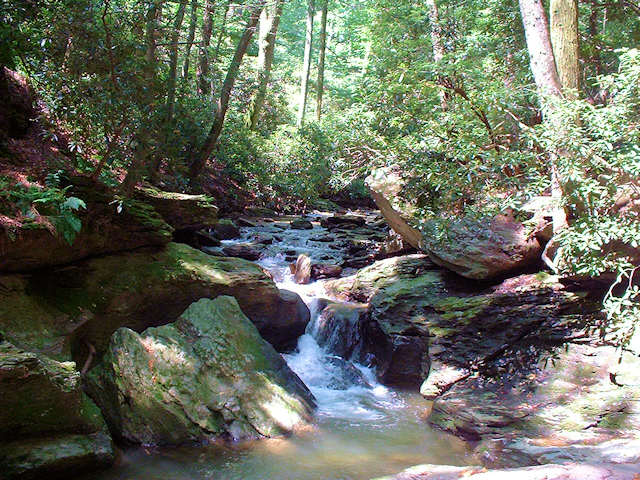
Tucquan Creek

Tucquan Creek is a 5.9-mile-long (9.5 km) stream and tributary of the Susquehanna River near Holtwood in southern Lancaster County, Pennsylvania. Together with parts of Clark Run and Tucquan Glen (Seven Streams) it is a designated Pennsylvania Scenic River. The Tucquan Glen hiking trail goes along both sides of the creek, starting from River Road and ending at the railroad tracks along the Susquehanna. In addition to the rugged loop trail, is a relatively flat dirt road going along and often crossing the creek to said railroad tracks.

== See also ==
- List of rivers of Pennsylvania
