= Coffeyville Resources =

Oil refining company

Coffeyville Resources, formerly known as the COOP Refinery, is a company which owns an oil refinery in Coffeyville, Kansas, United States. The refinery is owned and operated by Coffeyville Resources Refining & Marketing. The refinery employs about 500 people and produces approximately 2,100,000 US gallons (7,900,000 L) of gasoline per day, and 1,700,000 US gallons (6,400,000 L) of middle distillates per day, predominantly diesel oil. Coffeyville Resources is owned by CVR Energy Inc (NYSE: CVI), of Sugar Land, Texas.

== History ==
The refinery was built in 1906 by the National Refining Company, which was then the second largest oil company in the United States. Built on 75 acres (30 ha), the refinery processed 2,500 barrels per day (400 m^{3}/d) of crude oil, compared to today's 108,000-barrel-per-day (17,200 m^{3}/d) processing capacity. In 1944, National Refining Company sold the refinery to Cooperative Refinery Association. The nickname COOP would remain for years afterward. In 1982, CRA merged with Farmland Industries. In 2000, Coffeyville Resources purchased the refinery and was led by former TOSCO senior executive Phil L. Rinaldi.

The plant includes a nitrogen fertilizer plant adjacent to the refinery, owned and operated by Coffeyville Resources Nitrogen Fertilizers. Construction began on the nitrogen fertilizer facility in 1998. The initial build of the nitrogen fertilizer plant included shipping an existing gasification plant to Coffeyville from the West Coast. A Texaco coal gasification plant, originally located in Cool Water near Daggett, California, was disassembled, refurbished, and its technology converted to be able to gasify petroleum coke instead of coal. It was then reassembled to form the heart of the nitrogen fertilizer operations.

The plant is only one of two fertilizer plants in North America which does not rely on natural gas as a raw material. It first began production in late 2000. It operates using a petroleum coke gasification technology, formerly licensed by Texaco, as well as other technology, to produce approximately 369,300 short tons (335,000 t) of ammonia and 633,100 short tons (574,300 t) of Urea Ammonium Nitrate Solution (UAN) per year, and is among the lowest cost producers and marketers of upgraded nitrogen fertilizer products in North America.

== Nitrogen Fertilizer Operations - CVR Partners, LP ==
Production Process - The technology and processes used to produce ammonia and UAN are complex. The gasifier converts low priced petroleum coke into a hydrogen rich synthesis gas. The syngas is then converted into anhydrous ammonia in an ultra high efficiency ammonia plant. Subsequently, the ammonia is further upgraded into UAN in a fully integrated UAN plant.

The majority of the petroleum coke used in the state-of-the-art gasification process is supplied by the Coffeyville Resources Refining & Marketing, refinery located adjacent to the fertilizer operations which is owned by its parent company CVR Energy.

Historically, petroleum coke has been significantly less expensive than natural gas on a per ton of fertilizer produced basis and prices have been more stable when compared to natural gas prices. By using petroleum coke as the primary raw material feedstock instead of natural gas, CVR Partners’ nitrogen fertilizer business has historically been the lowest cost producer and marketer of ammonia and UAN fertilizers in North America.

In 2011, Coffeyville Resources Nitrogen Fertilizers produced 116,800 tons of ammonia available for sale, and also produced 714,100 tons of UAN.

== Units ==
According to CVR's filings with the US DOE's Energy Information Agency, the unit capacities for the CVR Coffeyville Refinery are presented below:

Unit	Capacity in BPCD
Total Refinery Nameplate	136,000
Atmospheric Distillation	136,000
Vacuum Distillation	46,000
Delayed Coking	25,000
FCC	36,000
Naphtha Reforming	26,000
Alkylation	10,000
Naphtha Hydrotreating	36,000
ULSD Hydrotreating	30,000
Kero/Jet Hydrotreating	9,000
Gasoline Hydrotreating	20,000
Other Distillate Hydrotreating	27,000
Hydrogen Production mmscf/d	22

In addition, the refinery is planning to build a renewable diesel/SAF plant using UOP's EcoFining technology to produce up to 30,000 bpd of SAF and/or Renewable Diesel.
