= Trainer Refinery =

Oil refining facility in Pennsylvania, US

- Location of the Trainer Refinery Trainer Refinery (the United States)
- Location: Trainer, Pennsylvania, United States; 39°49′20″N 75°24′16″W

Refinery details
- Owners: Monroe Energy, LLC (Delta Air Lines)
- Capacity: 185,000 barrels per day (29,400 m^{3}/d)

Trainer Refinery is an oil refinery located in Trainer, Pennsylvania. The facility is downstream from the Port of Chester and fifteen miles southwest of Philadelphia along the Delaware River. Stoney Creek is along its northern perimeter. The Trainer Refinery is owned by Monroe Energy, LLC, a subsidiary of Delta Air Lines. Monroe Energy acquired the facility in June 2012. Since that time, the refinery has focused on producing jet fuel, gasoline, diesel, and home heating oil.

== History ==
In 1891, the Union Petroleum Company leased 17 acres in Marcus Hook, Pennsylvania, from the Reading Company. The first plant, constructed primarily of wood, burned down in 1912. Union Petroleum Company was bought out by Sinclair Oil Corporation, which purchased the original lease and an additional 242 acres of land adjacent to Trainer, Pennsylvania. On March 17, 1925, Sinclair Oil opened its new $7 million state-of-the-art facility with a projected gasoline production of 6,000 gallons per day (approximately 22,712 liters).

In the late 1940s, Sinclair went through a number of expansions, notably the installation of a fluid catalytic cracking unit. In 1955, the company installed two new crude stills. According to the 1955 Sinclair Oil Annual Report, these expansions gave the plant an estimated crude processing capacity of 120,000 BPD (Barrels per Day). Atlantic-Richfield Company acquired the company in 1969 and, shortly thereafter, sold the refinery to BP, which then transferred the formal ownership to SOHIO. These transactions were a part of deals for the Alaskan Pipeline. The refinery then underwent a modernization expansion at an estimated cost of $200 million. BP took total ownership of the refinery after absorbing SOHIO in 1987.

In 1996, BP sold several refining assets, including the refinery at Marcus Hook, to Tosco Corporation, which shuttered the refinery after negotiations broke down with union employees. In 1997, Tosco reopened the facility as the Trainer Refinery, operating officially as part of Bayway Refining Company, a wholly owned subsidiary of Tosco. In 2001, the refinery became part of Phillips Petroleum Company after its acquisition of Tosco. In 2002, Conoco merged with Phillips to become ConocoPhillips. The plant shut down in late September 2011, due to a low profit margin. In 2012, downstream assets of ConocoPhillips were spun off to the newly formed Phillips 66.

In 2012, Phillips 66 sold the refinery to Monroe Energy, LLC, a wholly owned subsidiary of Delta Air Lines. Delta purchased the refinery nearly contemporaneously to Phil Rinaldi's purchase of the large PES Refinery (former Sunoco) nearby. Delta stated that it considered the purchase of the refinery an "innovative approach" towards managing fuel expenses. The "mastermind" of the transaction was Jon Ruggles, and it served as part of the airlines' strategic effort to manage its fuel price risk. The 185,000 barrel-per-day refinery restarted production in September 2012. Delta spent around $100 million to transition 40% of production to jet fuel for its commercial fleet. Under the leadership of then-Delta CEO Richard Anderson, the Trainer Refinery committed to procuring more oil from domestic companies. In July 2014, it announced a five-year deal with Texas logistics firm, Bridger LLC, who would supply 65,000 barrels of domestic crude a day, or about one-third of the crude oil refined at Trainer.

== Awards and recognition ==
The Trainer Refinery was recognized for its commitment to employee safety and environmental stewardship in 2021 by AFPM as the Distinguished Safety Award winner for 2021 for the USA.
