= Stoney Creek (Pennsylvania) =

- Location within Pennsylvania Location within the United States

Location
- Country: United States
- State: Pennsylvania
- County: Delaware County

Physical characteristics
- Source
  - location: Chester Township, Pennsylvania
  - coordinates: 39°50′57″N 75°24′27″W
- Mouth
  - location: Port of Chester
  - coordinates: 39°49′17″N 75°23′47″W
  - elevation: sea level (0 ft.)

Basin features
- River system: Delaware River

Stoney Creek is a tributary of the Delaware River in southeast Delaware County in Pennsylvania, United States. The stream rises in Chester Township, and flows through City of Chester and Trainer, at times creating their border. It discharges at the Port of Chester on the northern perimeter of the Trainer Refinery and south of Stoney Creek Yard. Historically it has been known a Middle Run and Stoney Run.

== Crossings ==
The creek lends its name to the Stoney Creek Secondary, a rail line operated by Conrail Shared Assets Operations as part of the South Jersey/Philadelphia Shared Assets Area, and serves as contract local carrier and switching company for both CSX Transportation and the Norfolk Southern Railway. The Philadelphia Subdivision of CSX Transportation also bridges the creek.

The Wilmington/Newark Line, one of the 13 commuter rail lines in SEPTA's SEPTA Regional Rail network, traverses the creek. Originally built by the Philadelphia, Wilmington and Baltimore Railroad, it is now part of the Northeast Corridor.

Delaware Expressway (I-95) and U.S. Route 13 also traverse the creek.

== Wastewater and pollutants ==
Stony Creek Technologies was a company that discharged into the creek. The company later sold he site adjacent to the creek. Federal courts found that the new property owners must pay for environmental cleanup costs that occurred before they acquired it. The so-called Metro Container site along the creek is a Superfund Site. The Trainer Refinery makes use of the creek for wastewater and pollutant discharges, which have sometimes exceeded permissible amounts.

== See also ==
- List of Delaware River tributaries
- List of rivers of Pennsylvania
- Stony Creek (Susquehanna River tributary)
- Stonycreek River in Pennsylvania
