= Pennsylvania Scenic Rivers =

Protected waterway designation in Pennsylvania

Pennsylvania Scenic Rivers are rivers that are designated "scenic" according to the criteria of the Pennsylvania Scenic Rivers Act (P.L. 1277, Act No. 283 as amended by Act 110, May 7, 1982). The scenic rivers are managed by a variety of State agencies and local conservancies. For the purposes of the act, "river" is defined as "...a flowing body of water or estuary or a section, portion, or tributary thereof, including rivers, streams, creeks, runs, kills, rills, and small lakes."

== Classifications ==
According to the Act, Pennsylvania Scenic Rivers fall into one of five classifications, depending on the amount of development along the shore, access to the river, and diversion of flow:

- Wild rivers are rivers or sections of rivers that are not impounded and are usually not accessible except by trail. Their watersheds and shorelines are essentially primitive and the waters unpolluted.
- Scenic rivers are rivers or sections of rivers that are not impounded. Their shorelines or watersheds are largely primitive and undeveloped but they are accessible in places by roads.
- Pastoral rivers are those that are not impounded except for historic or restored mill dams. There may be diversions or withdrawals to support agricultural activities, for example agricultural ponds. Their shorelines or watersheds may support a variety of farm or farm-related activities, but these activities may not interfere with the pastoral nature of the landscape.
- Recreational rivers or sections of rivers are easily accessible, may have some development along their shorelines, and may have been impounded or diverted in the past.
- Modified recreational rivers (or sections of rivers) are those in which the flow may be regulated by upstream control devices. Low dams are permitted as long as they do not increase the river beyond bankfull width. These rivers are designated for human activities which do not interfere with public use of the streams or enjoyment of their surroundings.

== List of Pennsylvania Scenic Rivers ==
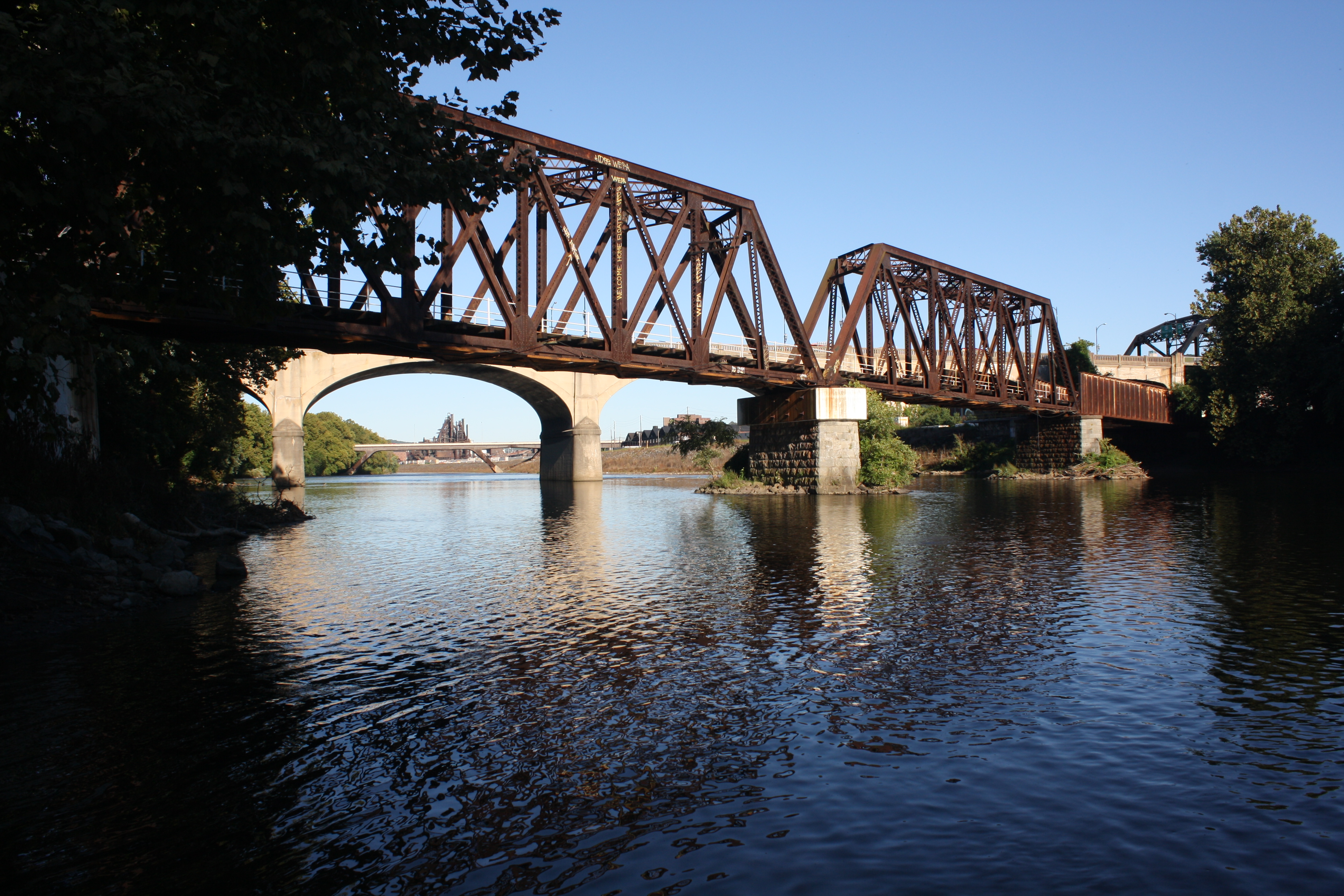
A railway bridge over the Lehigh River in Bethlehem, Pennsylvania

- Bear Run
- French Creek
- Lehigh River
- LeTort Spring Run
- Lick Run
- Lower Brandywine Creek
- Octoraro Creek
- Pine Creek
- Schuylkill River
- Stony Creek
- Tucquan Creek
- Tulpehocken Creek
- Yellow Breeches Creek
