= Chester Secondary =

Railway line in Pennsylvania and Delaware

Overview
- Owner: Conrail Shared Assets Operations

History
- Opened: 1838

Technical
- Line length: 14.9 mi (24.0 km)
- Track gauge: 1,435 mm (4 ft 8 1/2 in) standard gauge

The Chester Secondary is an active railroad line in the U.S. states of Pennsylvania and Delaware. The line is operated by Conrail Shared Assets Operations, which serves as contract local carrier and switching company for both CSX Transportation and the Norfolk Southern Railway. The line runs from Philadelphia to Claymont, Delaware, a distance of 14.9 miles (24.0 km). It traverses the namesake Stoney Creek, Chester Creek, Ridley Creek, Crum Creek and Darby Creek near their mouths along the shore of the Delaware River.

This line should not be confused with the Stony Creek Branch, which is a former Reading line in Montgomery County, Pennsylvania between Norristown and Lansdale, 9.9 miles (15.9 km) in length and operated by CSX for freight only.

== Description ==
The Chester Secondary begins south of CSX East side yard (RG Tower off the Philly Sub at Eastwick and heads toward SEPTA's Airport Line. At 60th Street Junction, the line merges with the former Reading Company line to the Philadelphia International Airport. South of the Eastwick SEPTA station, to the point where the Chester Secondary leaves the Airport Line (which heads to Philadelphia International Airport), the railroad line parallels Pennsylvania Route 291, a state highway which is often close by the Chester Secondary. After ducking under Interstate 95 and PA 291, the line briefly heads solo towards Lester and Tinicum Township where the line runs a short distance south of PA 291. The line then encounters Wanamaker Yard near Darby Creek which is crossed using the former PRR bascule bridge, still active for water traffic (the adjacent Reading Company drawbridge, identical in design, was abandoned by Conrail and is permanently raised). Entering Eddystone, the line passes the Boeing Helicopter Facility and Exelon's Eddystone Generation Facility. After passing those two companies the secondary ends and becomes a running track. The line briefly curves around a few industries before returning to follow PA 291. At this point, the line briefly parallels the highway and Amtrak's Northeast Corridor and enters Chester. Here, the railroad line leaves PA 291 to pass behind the Pennsylvania State Correctional Institution (SCI-Chester) and then proceeds behind some warehouses including those for Scott Paper. The Chester running track crosses the Chester Creek on a small bridge and now runs one block south of PA 291, continuing that way for most of the way to Stoney Creek Yard, north of namesake Stoney Creek. The line continues through the former Sunoco refinery (now operated by Energy Transfer Partners) across the Pennsylvania-Delaware border before ending just short of Naamans Creek in Claymont. There is also a connection from Stoney Creek Yard to Hook Interlocking on the Northeast Corridor which crosses US 13.

== History ==
The oldest part of the Chester Secondary was the original main line of the Philadelphia, Wilmington and Baltimore Railroad between Gray's Ferry and Eddystone. This line opened in 1838, as part of the line between Philadelphia and Wilmington. The company built a new alignment between Philadelphia and Eddystone in 1873, and leased the old line to the Philadelphia and Reading Railway. At the same time, the Chester and Delaware River Railroad had built a branch line in Chester to serve industries there. The Philadelphia and Reading took stock control of the Chester and Delaware River Railroad and connected the two lines.

The Chester and Delaware River was merged into the Reading Company in 1924. Ownership of the line passed to Conrail on the Reading's final bankruptcy in 1976. Conrail sold part of the line to Philadelphia in 1978 for the development of the Airport Line.

== Traffic ==
Today, the line sees mostly short local freight trains. There are plenty of warehouses that line the track for boxcar usage and a few chemical companies bring in tank car and covered hopper transport.

== Yards ==
The line has two yards along the entire line: Wanamaker Yard in Tinicum Township and Stoney Creek Yard in Trainer.
