= Piney Point phosphate plant =

Industrial site in Manatee County, Florida

- Built: September 1966
- Operated: Prosphate mining: September 1966–1999
- Location: 13300 Scale Avenue; Palmetto, Florida 34221; Manatee County, Florida
- Coordinates: 27°37′45″N 82°31′30″W
- Industry: Fertilizer plant
- Area: 676 acres (274 ha)
- Owner: HRK Holdings

Piney Point phosphate plant is an industrial site in Manatee County, Florida and the location of a former fertilizer plant. The land is currently owned by HRK Holdings, which leases portions of the land to industrial tenants under the name Eastport.

In March 2021, a dam to a reservoir storing wastewater from phosphate tailings within a phosphogypsum stack generated by the plant's operations began to fail, prompting evacuations on April 1 followed by the governor of Florida issuing a state of emergency on April 3. Contaminated toxic water was discharged into Tampa Bay in an effort to prevent the reservoir's collapse.

Although ordered to be closed in August 2021, the plant is currently scheduled to close by end of 2026.

== Background ==
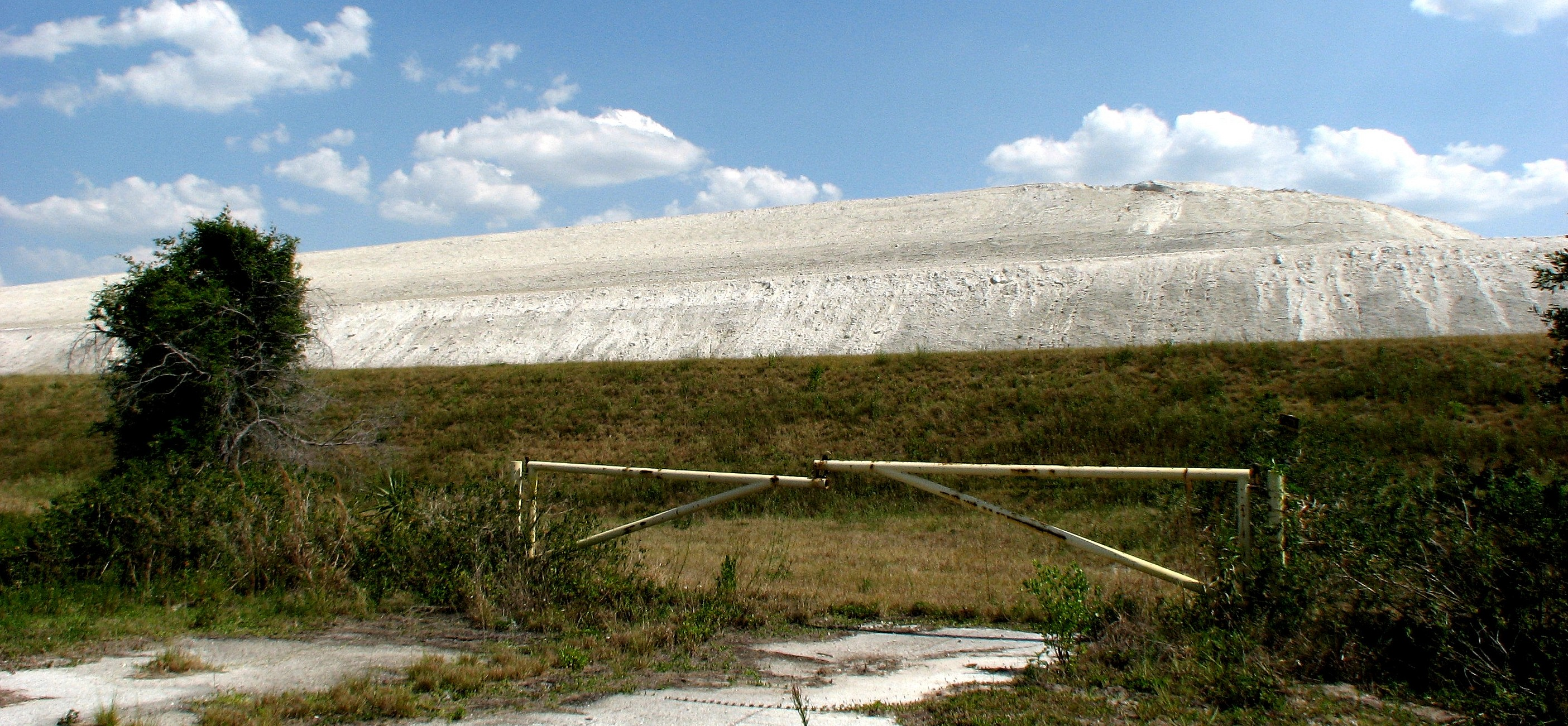
A phosphogypsum stack located in nearby Fort Meade, Florida, the Piney Point stack encloses wastewater

Borden Chemical opened an industrial plant on the site in September 1966 to process phosphate, a key ingredient in fertilizer. By 1970, it had been discovered that the plant was dumping waste into Bishop Harbor, resulting in fish kills. The plant changed hands multiple times in the 1980s, beginning with Borden transferring the property to AMAX Phosphate in 1980. AMAX sold the plant in 1986 to FCS Energy, which was absorbed into Consolidated Minerals, Inc.

By 1988, the plant had changed hands again, this time to Royster Phosphates. In 1989, a leaking storage tank released 23,000 US gallons (87 m^{3}) of sulfate, prompting evacuations of the area. Two incidents in 1991 released sulfur dioxide and sulfur trioxide into the air, killing three workers and creating an acid cloud that caused 30 people to become ill. The FBI seized company records in 1992.

Mulberry Corporation purchased the plant in 1993 when Royster Phosphates declared bankruptcy. Phil L. Rinaldi was the CEO and the company's entrepreneur. Mulberry ceased operations at the plant in 1999 due to a lack of funds. In January 2001, Mulberry abandoned the property just 48 hours after notifying the government that it could no longer afford to ensure environmental security, and days before declaring bankruptcy. The Federal Environmental Protection Agency (EPA) briefly stepped in to oversee the plant, with the property later passing to the Florida Department of Environmental Protection (FDEP) through a court-appointed receivership. In 2004, Hurricane Frances caused a hole in a dike, releasing 70 million US gallons (260×10^{3} m^{3}) of contaminated water.

The site was purchased from the government by HRK Holdings, LLC in 2006 for $4.3 million, with the requirement that they maintain the phosphogypsum stacks and the contaminated wastewater left by the plant's former operations. In 2011, another spill dumped 170 million US gallons (640×10^{3} m^{3}) of contaminated water into Bishop Harbor and Tampa Bay. Bishop Harbor has stricter environmental protections given its Outstanding Florida Water designation.

HRK Holdings filed for Chapter 11 bankruptcy in 2012, citing expenses from the leak the previous year, when HRK had allowed the Manatee County Port Authority to store materials from the dredging of Port Manatee's Berth 12 expansion in reservoirs on the property. Portions of the property were sold to Port Manatee, Thatcher Chemical of Florida, Manatee Bulk Storage, and an affiliate of Mayo Fertilizer and Farm Supply as part of bankruptcy restructuring for HRK. The remaining property is leased by HRK as an industrial park under the name Eastport, with access to Port Manatee, multiple highways, and a rail yard connected directly to the CSX mainline.

In September 2020, WMNF reported on increasing concerns about rising water levels at the site due to rains and the potential of reaching capacity with just one hurricane. In October, Florida environmental advocacy group ManaSota-88 called on the EPA to investigate the site, calling out "increased the risks of a catastrophic failure of their earthen impoundments".

In February 2021, national and regional environmental groups petitioned the EPA, under the Biden administration, to raise environmental protections from phosphogypsum stacks in at least 12 states under the Resource Conservation and Recovery Act and the Toxic Substances Control Act; well-known groups included Center for Biological Diversity, Waterkeeper Alliance, and Sierra Club.

== 2021 incident ==
On March 25, 2021, leaks were discovered in the containment wall of a 67-acre (27 ha) holding pool located in a stack of phosphogypsum, storing approximately 480 million US gallons (1.8×10^{6} m^{3}) of wastewater containing nitrogen, phosphorus, ammonia, and small amounts of radium and uranium from the former operations at the plant, as well as seawater from the dredging of Berth 12 at Port Manatee. The leak was reported to authorities on March 26 and worsened over the following days. Residents in the area were ordered to evacuate on April 1. Efforts to repair the leaks on April 2 and 3 were unsuccessful, and Florida Governor Ron DeSantis declared a local state of emergency for the entire county, and wider evacuations were conducted on April 3. An estimated 316 households were within the evacuation zone. Contaminated water was being pumped from the reservoir and discharged into Tampa Bay at the rate of 22,000 US gallons (83 m^{3}) per minute in an effort to prevent the collapse of the reservoir, which threatened to flood the surrounding area and destabilize two adjacent pools storing more hazardous wastewater.

DeSantis toured the site on April 4 and, in a press conference, stated that the wastewater discharged into Tampa Bay was not considered radioactive but did contain phosphorus and nitrogen. The worst-case scenario he described in the press conference was a 20-foot (6.1 m)- high wave of contaminated water flooding the surrounding area and potentially destabilizing gypsum stacks that contain radioactive material. Officials said that once the situation has been resolved, they intend to permanently close the site, with the reservoirs drained, filled, and capped. If the contaminated water drains through leaks in the radioactive soil of which the stacks are made, however, that radioactive soil could be carried along with the water and issues arose regarding the condition of the plastic liners used in the stacks.

The Manatee County commission voted to allow the contaminated water held in the stacks to be injected into deep wells, which had been banned when proposed previously by an owner of the property. Deep-well injection with contaminated water is a controversial procedure that could adversely affect the aquifer used for agricultural irrigation and drinking water, contaminating the water source.

Florida lawmakers secured $100 million to permanently close Piney Point and clean the site. In August, HRK Holdings LLC was sued by the Florida Department of Environmental Protection (FDEP) for failure to operate the site safely.
