= Samuel Morris (soldier) =

American soldier

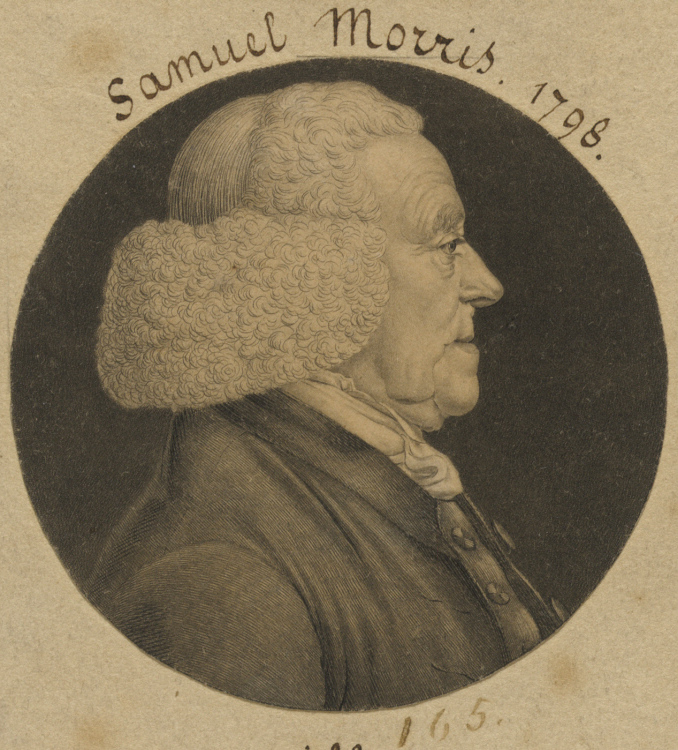
- Born: June 24, 1734; Philadelphia
- Died: July 7, 1812; Philadelphia
- Children: 10
- Father: Anthony Morris

Samuel Morris (June 24, 1734 – July 7, 1812) was an American soldier in the American Revolutionary War. He is the patriarch of one of Philadelphia's most prominent families.

== Biography ==
Samuel Morris was born in Philadelphia, Province of Pennsylvania. He was the son of Anthony Morris (14 Feb 1705/06–2 Oct 1780) and the former Sarah Powell (29 Jun 1713–10 Apr 1751). His grandfather was Anthony Morris (II).

He served several terms in the legislature, and married Rebecca Wistar, daughter of Caspar Wistar (the elder).

In 1776, he was elected "governor" of the social club known as "The State in Schuylkill," and re-elected annually until his death. He was also a founder and president for many years of the "Gloucester fox-hunting club." When the first troop of Philadelphia city cavalry was organized, no fewer than twenty-two members of the club were enrolled in its ranks.

With Morris as its captain (because the first captain chosen, Abraham Markoe, was forbidden to fight because of his Danish citizenship), the troop reported for duty in the Continental Army and served through the campaign of 1776–77, seeing action in the battles of Trenton and Princeton, in which latter engagement Samuel's brother Anthony, ensign of the Pennsylvania Associators, was killed. On temporarily relieving the command from duty in January, 1777, Washington returned his "most sincere thanks to the captain," and added that, although the troop was "composed of gentlemen of fortune," its members had "shown a noble example of discipline and subordination." For thus taking part in the Revolution, Captain Morris was disowned by the Quakers, but he continued until his death to wear the dress and use the language of that sect, worshiping with them regularly.

Morris died in Philadelphia, July 7, 1812.

== Children ==
Samuel and Rebecca Morris had ten children:

- Samuel Morris (Bef. 1758, Philadelphia – Bef. 1775, Philadelphia; less than 17 years) he did not marry.
- Sarah Morris (19 Jan 1758, Philadelphia – 7 Jan 1831; 72 years) she married Richard Wistar, March 14, 1782.
- Benjamin Wistar Morris (14 Aug 1762, Philadelphia – 24 Apr 1825, Wellsboro, Pennsylvania; 62 years) he married Mary Wells, Nov. 24, 1785.
- Caspar W. Morris (12 Sep 1764, Philadelphia – 27 Feb 1828; 63 years), he married Elizabeth Giles Nov. 24, 1795.
- Anthony Morris (10 Feb 1766, Philadelphia - 3 Nov 1860; 94 years) he married Mary Smith Pemberton May 13, 1790.
- Luke W. Morris (25 Jun 1768, Philadelphia – 4 Jun 1830; 61 years) he married Elizabeth Morris Buckley March 24, 1791, and Ann Pancoast April 4, 1800.
- Isaac Wistar Morris (19 Jul 1770, Philadelphia – 8 May 1831; 60 years) he married Sarah Paschall December 17, 1795.
- Catharine W. Morris (22 Apr 1772, Philadelphia - 10 Dec 1859; 87 years) she did not marry.
- Samuel Morris (4 Mar 1775, Philadelphia – 17 Sep 1793 of yellow fever; 18 years) he did not marry.
- Israel Wistar Morris (27 Feb 1778, Reading, Pennsylvania - 17 Aug 1870, Philadelphia; 92 years) he married Mary Hollingsworth June 12, 1799.

== House ==
The Reynolds-Morris House, built in 1787 and purchased in 1817 by Samuel's son, Luke Wistar Morris, still stands in Philadelphia. Owned by the Morris family for more than a century, it was designated a National Historic Landmark in 1967 and is currently operated as a hotel.
