= Reynolds-Morris House =

Historic house in Pennsylvania, United States

- U.S. National Register of Historic Places
- U.S. National Historic Landmark
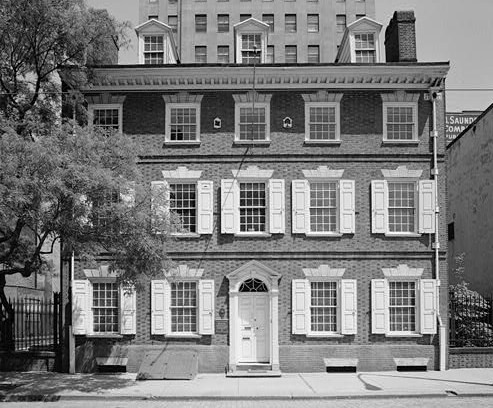
- Reynolds-Morris House in May 1972

- Location within Philadelphia Location within Pennsylvania Location within the United States
- Location: 225 S. 8th Street, Philadelphia, Pennsylvania, U.S.
- Coordinates: 39°56′49″N 75°9′18″W
- Area: < 1-acre (0.40 ha)
- Built: 1786–1787
- Architects: John and William Reynolds
- Architectural style: Georgian
- NRHP reference No.: 67000020

Significant dates
- Added to NRHP: December 24, 1967
- Designated NHL: December 24, 1967

The Reynolds-Morris House is an historic house located at 225 South 8th Street in the Washington Square West neighborhood of Philadelphia, Pennsylvania. Built between 1786 and 1787 by John and William Reynolds, it is a well-preserved example of a Philadelphia Georgian townhouse.

It was designated a National Historic Landmark in 1967, and is currently operated as a hotel. Debuting as the Morris House Hotel in 2004, the building was inducted into Historic Hotels of America, an official program of the National Trust for Historic Preservation, in 2022.

== Description and history ==
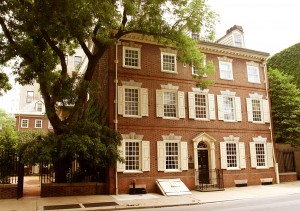
The Reynolds-Morris House in 2012

The Reynolds-Morris House stands one block west of Washington Square in Philadelphia's Center City, on the east side of South 8th Street between St. James and Locust Streets. It is a 3 1/2-story brick building, with a gabled roof pierced by pedimented gable dormers. It is five bays wide, with the main entrance at the center, framed by pilasters and a half-round transom topped by a gable.

The walls are laid in Flemish bond, with projecting stringcourses between the floors. Sash windows are set under heavy splayed stone lintels with scoring that is intended to resemble keystoning. The interior spaces are adorned with high quality Federal period woodwork.

The house is a rare example of a double rowhouse, built on two lots in 1786–87 by John and William Reynods. It was sold in 1817 to Luke Wistar Morris, the son of captain Samuel Morris of the First City Troop, of the prominent Morris family, who occupied the house for 120 years.

Although it was built as a rowhouse, the neighboring houses were bought and torn down by the Morrises in the early 20th century. The historic home was later transformed into a boutique hotel amid a greater series of renovations during the early 21st century.

== See also ==
- List of National Historic Landmarks in Philadelphia
- National Register of Historic Places listings in Center City, Philadelphia
