= Old Philadelphians =

Pennsylvanians who claim descent from historic families

Old Philadelphians, also called Proper Philadelphians or Perennial Philadelphians, are the First Families of Philadelphia, that class of Pennsylvanians who claim hereditary and cultural descent mainly from England, also from Ulster, Wales and even Germany, and who founded the city of Philadelphia. They settled the state of Pennsylvania.

They are considered part of the historic core of the East Coast establishment, along with other wealthy families such as Boston Brahmins of Boston and The Four Hundred of New York City. These families were influential in the development and leadership of arts, culture, science, medicine, law, politics, industry and trade in the United States. They were almost exclusively white Anglo-Saxon Protestants (WASPs), and most belonged to the Episcopal church and Quakerism.

== Families ==
In 1963, Nathaniel Burt, a chronicler of Old Philadelphia, wrote that of Philadelphia's most notable early figures were listed in "the ancient rhyme, rather out-of-date now, called the Philadelphia Rosary," which goes:

Morris, Norris, Rush and Chew,
Drinker, Dallas, Coxe and Pugh,
Wharton, Pepper, Pennypacker,
Willing, Shippen and Markoe.

Burt's full list of prominent families (with those in the poem in italics):

Annenberg, Bacon, Baer, Baird, Ballard, Baltzell, Barrymore, Barton, Bartram, Berwind, Biddle, Bingham, Binney, Biswanger, Bispham, Bok, Bond, Borie, Bradford, Brinton, Broadbent, Bromley, Brooke, Buckley, Bullitt, Burpee, Cadwalader, Cassatt, Castor, Carey Cheston, Chew, Clark, Clothier, Hadley, Coates, Converse, Cope, Coxe, Cramp, Curtis,

Da Costa, Dallas, Dickinson, Disston, Dorrance, Drayton, Drexel, Drinker, Duane, Duke, Elkins, Earle, Emlen, Evans, Fisher, Foulke, Fox, Francis, Franks, Furness, Gates, Geyelin, Gowen,

Gratz, Griffith, Griffitts, Griscom, Gross, Grubb, Hamilton, Hare, Harrison, Hart, Hays, Hazard, Henry, Hopkinson, Houston, Huston, Hutchinson, Ingersoll, Jayne, Jeanes, Jones, Keating, Kelly,

Landreth, Lea, Lewis, Lippincott, Lloyd, Logan, Lorimer, Lovekin, Lukens, McCall, McKean, McLean, Madeira, Markoe, Matlack, Meade, Meigs, Meredith, Merrick, Middleton, Mitchell, Montgomery, Morgan, Morris, Mummert, Munson, Newbold, Newhall, Newlin, Norris, Oaks, Oakes, Packard, Patterson, Paul, Peale, Pegg, Penn, Pennypacker, Penrose, Pepper, Peterson, Pew, Platt, Potts, Powel, Price, Pugh, Rawle, Randolph, Read, Redman, Reed, Rhoads, Rittenhouse, Robbins, Roberts, Rosenbach, Rosengarten, Ross, Rush, Sands, Savage, Scattergood, Scott, Scull, Sergeant,

Shelmire, Shippen, Sims, Sinkler, Smith, Stern, Stetson, Stockton, Stokes, Stotesbury, Taft, Thayer, Toland, Townsend, Van Leer, Van Pelt, Van Rensselear, Vauclain, Vaux, Wanamaker, Wetherill, Wharton, Whitaker, Widener, Willing, Wistar, Wister, Wolf, Wood, Wright, and Yarnall.

Members of these families are generally known for being fiscally conservative, socially liberal, and well educated. These families often have deeply established traditions in the Quaker and Episcopal faiths. Many Old Philadelphia families intermarried and their descendants summer in Northeast Harbor, Desert Island, Maine. Many of these families trace their ancestries back to the original founders of Philadelphia while others entered into aristocracy during the nineteenth century with their profits from commerce and trade or by marrying into established Old Philadelphia families like the Cadwaladers and Biddles and Pitcairns.

== Clubs and societies ==
Old Philadelphia exclusive clubs and societies

- Acorn Club
- Athenaeum of Philadelphia
- Colonial Society of Pennsylvania
- Contributionship/Hand-in-Hand
- Dancing Assemblies of Philadelphia
- First Troop Philadelphia City Cavalry
- Germantown Cricket Club
- Gulph Mills Golf Club
- Merion Cricket Club
- Orpheus Club
- Numismatic and Antiquarian Society of Philadelphia
- Penllyn Club
- Philadelphia Charity Ball
- The Philadelphia Club
- Philadelphia Corinthian Yacht Club
- Philadelphia Cricket Club
- Pickering Hunt
- The Rabbit
- Racquet Club of Philadelphia
- Radnor Hunt Club
- Rittenhouse Club
- Schuylkill Fishing Company
- Society of Colonial Wars
- Sons of the Revolution
- Society of the Sons of St. George of Philadelphia
- Union League of Philadelphia
- Welcome Society of Pennsylvania
- Wistar Parties

== See also ==
- Old money
- Philadelphia Main Line
- Boston Brahmins
- Patrician
- Bourgeoisie
- Bourgeois of Brussels
- Seven Noble Houses of Brussels
- Daig
