= Samuel Howell =

American colonist (1723–1807)

Personal details
- Born: March 11, 1723 Upper Chichester Township, Pennsylvania
- Died: December 9, 1807 (aged 84) Tacony, Philadelphia, Pennsylvania
- Spouse: Sarah Stretch
- Children: 6
- Profession: Merchant

Samuel Howell (March 11, 1723 – December 9, 1807) was an American Quaker who became a prominent merchant in colonial Philadelphia and a leading patriot, proponent, leader and financier for American independence.

When Samuel Howell married Sarah Stretch in 1745, he was a hatter, but became a merchant and importer, and rose to prominence becoming one of the leading and wealthiest merchants of his time. Typical advertisements Samuel Howell placed in the Pennsylvania Gazette show the wide variety of goods and services he offered, examples being on October 24, 1751, page 2 and October 18, 1753, page 3 announcing a large variety of goods, which he had just imported from London, for sale in his shop at the "Sign of the Beaver in Chestnut Street", located at the corner of Chestnut Street and Strawberry Alley.

A Quaker, Samuel was disowned by his meeting on 12 September 1762 for "fitting out his ships in a warlike manner"; his wife was disowned four years later.

"Whereas Samuel Howell of this city merchant, professeth himself convinced of the Christian testimony of Friends against Wars of Fighting, yet persists in fitting out his ships in a warlike manner for which he hath been long treated with in much love and tenderness, and the inconsistency of his conduct laid before him, but as he does not show a proper regard to the advice of friends by discontinuing the practice, and no grounds to expect his compliance therewith, this meeting for the clearing of truth disowns the said Samuel Howell being in religious fellowship with us, until from strict sense of his breach of our testimony he shall seek to be reconciled to friends, and condemns the same to the satisfaction of this meeting, which it is our desire he may be enabled to do, by a more steady attention to the dictates of the peaceable principle of the gospel in his own heart."

He was drawn into the political life of pre-Revolutionary Philadelphia.

In 1765 Samuel Howell "the Merchant" was a signer of the historic Resolution of Non-Importation Made by the Citizens of Philadelphia, October 25, 1765, and one of the prominent merchants selected to solicit other signers and to see that the agreement was put into effect.

He was a member of the local Committee on Correspondence in 1774, Committee of Safety in 1775 and served as a member, 1776–1777. The Committee of Safety was, in fact, a board of war, and had the direction of military affairs in the province. and in 1776 elected to the Pennsylvania Assembly.

He served as chairman of the Philadelphia Committee of Safety and member of the Pennsylvania Council of Safety, discharging executive duties of the state government during the Revolution. Two days after his appointment, the Convention adopted the Declaration of Independence. After the evacuation of Philadelphia by the British he served as a member of the Pennsylvania General Assembly.

Howell gave his family's silver to make the first U. S. currency.

Samuel Howell became a contributor to Pennsylvania Hospital in 1754, was one of its Board of Managers, 1784–9, and President of the Board 1786–9. In 1757 Samuel Howell was a signer of Pennsylvania colonial currency. Notes totaling £45,000 were authorized March 10, 1757, a total of 72,825 notes, to be signed by any three of twenty-four signers, one of who was Samuel Howell. In 1788 Howell was one of the port wardens of Philadelphia, and on March 19, 1791, was appointed by President George Washington as a Commissioner of the Bank of the United States.

Howell became a member of the Schuylkill Fishing Company, member No. 133 elected May 1, 1769. His father-in-law's brother, Thomas Stretch, was the founding Governor, member No. 1 elected May 1, 1732; father-in-law Joseph Stretch was member No. 14, elected May 1, 1732, son-in-law Peter Stretch II (1746–1793), member No. 128 elected May 1, 1769; and Samuel Howell's son, Samuel Jr., member No. 150 elected March 10, 1784.

After the Revolution, when the United States began to trade directly with China, Samuel Howell was an investor in many of the early ventures. In 1788, one of his ships, Sampson, captained by son Samuel Jr., was among the first to sail to China, leaving Philadelphia on November 28, 1788, and returning July 3, 1790. Advertisements in Dunlap's American Daily Advertiser in 1792 announced the sale of nankeens and several varieties of tea that he had imported from China in the ship Sampson. In addition to his residence and store at 54 Chestnut Street in Philadelphia, he owned another lot with stores and a wharf on the east side of Water Street. The Pennsylvania Museum of Art collection of several pieces of China imported by Samuel Howell and his son can be seen here.

He possessed a large landed and personal estate, the latter alone, as shown by the account of his executors, amounting to over $284,000. In today's terms this sum indicates a wealth of $8.1 billion, excluding the value of massive land holdings.

In his Last Will and Testament, Samuel Howell chronicalized three generations of his family, distributing to his surviving children and grandchildren portions of his estate, in many instances with specificity.

In his six-page Will, recorded in Philadelphia Will Book Z, at pp 210–213

12 Dec 1807 - "Samuel Howell of the City and County of Philadelphia . . . bequeaths to my daughter Sarah Stretch widow of Peter Stretch . . ." [pg 210]

". . . bequeaths to the Contributors to the Pennsylvania Hospital . . ." [pg 211] (on whose Board he served, 1784-1789)

". . .grandson Samuel E. Howell and his heirs . . .my mansion and lot situated at the north west corner of Chestnut Street and Strawberry . . ." [pg 212]. This location, also known during colonial times as the "Sign of the Beaver", is where Samuel Howell "the Merchant" began his business selling hats, dry goods and other commodities.. This key detail helps distinguish and clarify Samuel Howell, the Merchant, as the American colonial patriot whose service for the Independence of the United States had its beginning with signing the Non-Importation Agreement.

. . . to my grandson Joseph E. Howell . . .lot where he now resides, No. 54 Chestnut Street and which I formerly dwelt. . . also wharf and water lot of ground situate on the East side of the water, between High and Chestnut Streets in said City of Philadelphia and in tenure of Jones and Howell Brokers and is bounded by my wharf and lot of ground known by the name of the Crooked Billet Tavern . . .[pg 213]

== Family ==
Samuel Howell, the son of Thomas Howell and Rachel Clayton, was born at Marcus Hook, Chichester, Chester (now Delaware) County, Pennsylvania, March 11, 1723, and died at Tacony, Pennsylvania December 9, 1807. His decease is noted in the Philadelphia Aurora of 14 December 1807: "DIED - at his seat, (Tacony near Frankford) on the ninth instant, in the 85th year of his age, SAMUEL HOWELL, Esq., for many years a Merchant of great respectability in this city."

Samuel Howell and Sarah Stretch were married in the presence of their parents at Friends' Meeting, Philadelphia, on December 12, 1745. Their wedding certificate, a large document which all family members present signed, states: ". . .Samuel Howell of the city of Philadelphia, and province of Pennsylvania, Hatter, son of Thomas Howell of Township Chichester in the County of Chester. . .". The signatures on this document include Samuel Howell's parents: Thomas Howell and Rachel Howell, and Sarah Stretch's parents Joseph and Lydia Stretch.

Samuel's great-grandfather, also named Thomas Howell, emigrated to New Jersey arriving October 28, 1682. Thomas was from Tamworth, Staffordshire, England where he possessed a landed estate. He represented Gloucester County in the West Jersey Assembly in 1683 and 1685, at the time he acquired lands in West Jersey. Thomas died March 9, 1687, at Newton, Gloucester, New Jersey. His coat of arms, from England, is shown below.

Samuel Howell married Sarah Stretch (1733–1770), daughter of Joseph Stretch (1709–1771) and Lydia Knight, at Friends' Meeting, Philadelphia, on December 12, 1745. Samuel's wife, Sarah, died March 28, 1770, at the age of 37. Her father, Joseph Stretch, was the brother of Thomas Stretch.

Children of Samuel and Sarah Howell:

A. Sarah Howell (1746-1825) married Peter Stretch II (1746-1793), son of Thomas Stretch and Mary Ann Robbins. She died at Burlington, New Jersey, in April, 1825. Children:
1. Elizabeth Stretch
2. Joseph H. Stretch, deceased by 1818.
3. Mary Howell Stretch (1778-1843), married Theodorus Van Wyck (1776-1840). He was a distant cousin of Augustus Van Wyck, Charles Van Wyck and Robert Anderson Van Wyck, their common ancestors were Theodorus Van Wyck (1668-1753) and his wife Margretia Brinckerhoff Van Wyck. Theodorus Van Wyck's maternal grandfather was Pierre Van Cortlandt (1721-1814), Lieutenant Governor of New York, 1777-1795. Among their children:

Sarah Howell Van Wyck (1806–1830) married James Budd (1798–1833) of New Jersey.

B. Samuel Howell, Jr. (ca 1748-1802) born in Philadelphia; died 31 October 1802. He married Margaret Emlen (1750-1822), 23 May 1771. Like his father and kinsmen, he became a member of the State in Schuylkill, March 10, 1784. In 1772 Samuel Howell, Jr. was a signer of Pennsylvania colonial currency. Notes totaling £25,000 were authorized March 21, 1772, 72,825 notes, to be signed by any one of twenty-four signers, one of who was Samuel Howell, Jr.

C. Elizabeth Howell, married George Douglass at Philadelphia, 8 December 1767. Both deceased prior to 15 February 1808.

D. Joseph Howell, died at Philadelphia, PA, August, 1798. He married Catharine Reynolds.

E. Mary Howell, married Mr. Pascoe, of the Bermudas.

F. Rachel Howell, married Benjamin Thompson on April 29, 1782.

== Samuel Howell (1718-1780) ==
Misinformation based on an erroneous family genealogy confuses Samuel Howell (1723–1807), "the Merchant", who was a Member of the Committee of Safety and Signer of the 1765 Non-importation Agreement, the son of Thomas Howell and Rachel Clayton, with another Samuel Howell (1718–1780), son of Jacob Howell and Sarah Vernon. As demonstrated in documents cites above, including his Last Will and Testament, it is Samuel Howell the Merchant whose business was based at the Sign of the Beaver, located at the corner of Chestnut Street and Strawberry, which was among the properties he bequeathed at the time of his death in 1807. Among the source documents and research confirming this are birth records, will and probate records and other sources cited above. Samuel Howell (1718–1780) died eleven years before President Washington bestowed a Commission to Samuel Howell, the financier and merchant, as a Commissioner of the United States Bank.

The confusion arises from Jonathan Howell's unsourced family genealogy conflating these two Samuel Howells. Sadly, this error has been relied upon by some without further study. by the Historical Society of Pennsylvania - Philadelphia's Library of American History

As demonstrated by his Last Will and Testament, Samuel Howell "the Merchant" and his family continued to own and occupy his property at "The Sign of the Beaver", corner of Chestnut and Strawberry, which he bequeathed in 1807 to a grandson.

12 Dec 1807 - "Samuel Howell of the City and County of Philadelphia . . . bequeaths to my daughter Sarah Stretch widow of Peter Stretch . . ." [pg 210]

". . . bequeaths to the Contributors to the Pennsylvania Hospital . . ." [pg 211] (on whose Board he served, 1784-1789)

". . .grandson Samuel E. Howell and his heirs . . .my mansion and lot situated at the north west corner of Chestnut Street and Strawberry . . ." [pg 212]. This location, also known during colonial times as the "Sign of the Beaver", where Howell began his business selling hats, dry goods and other commodities.. This key detail helps distinguish and clarify Samuel Howell, the Merchant, as the American colonial patriot whose service for the Independence of the United States had its beginning with signing the Non-Importation Agreement.

. . . to my grandson Joseph E. Howell . . .lot where he now resides, No. 54 Chestnut Street and which I formerly dwelt. . . also wharf and water lot of ground situate on the East side of the water, between High and Chestnut Streets in said City of Philadelphia and in tenure of Jones and Howell Brokers and is bounded by my wharf and lot of ground known by the name of the Crooked Billet Tavern . . .[pg 213]

== Life in Colonial Philadelphia ==
Samuel Howell was instructed in that of hatter, but early in life abandoned this calling to engage in mercantile pursuits. He removed to Philadelphia, where he established himself as an importer and merchant, and rose to prominence, becoming one of the leading and wealthiest merchants of his time.

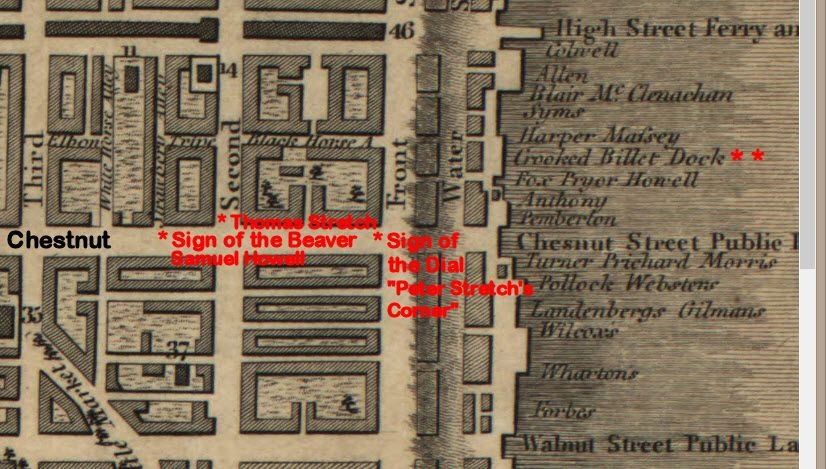
Location of the "Sign of the Beaver" at Strawberry Alley and Chestnut Street, and the Crooked Billet Dock. Howell's father-in-law, Thomas Stretch, was initially located as a clockmaker at Peter Stretch's Corner, at Front and Chestnut Streets, inherited in 1746 from his father. Around 1747-48 Thomas sold his father's property and moved a block further west, to the southwest corner of Second and Chestnut, one block east of Howell's property. Detail from "Plan of the City of Philadelphia and its Environs (Showing the Improved Parts)," 1797.

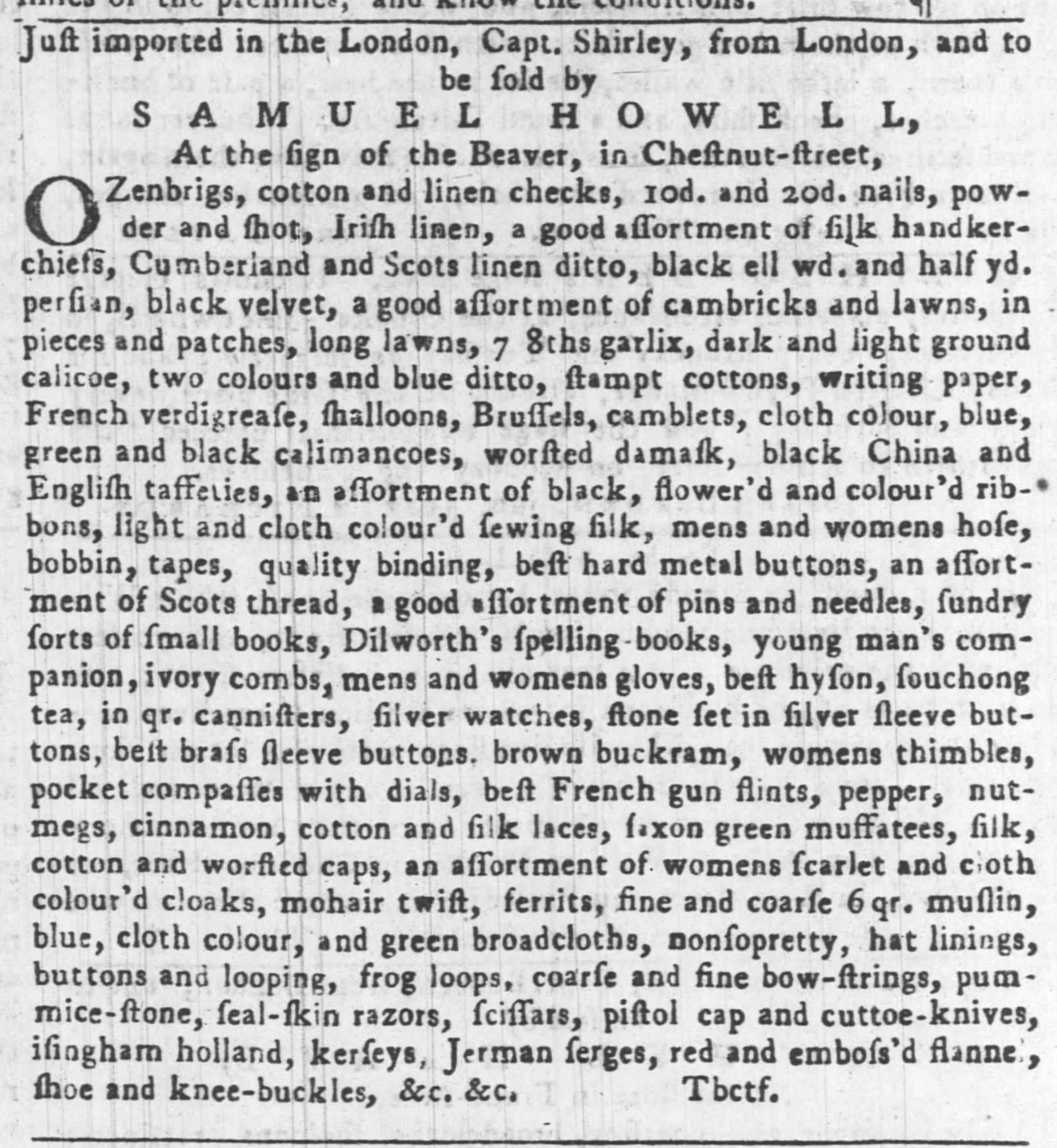
Samuel Howell's advertisement printed by Benjamin Franklin, Pennsylvania Gazette, October 11, 1753

Howell opened a mercantile business located at Strawberry Alley and Chestnut Street, Philadelphia, at the "Sign of the Beaver" involved in importing goods, providing transportation to Europe by sea and other activities. An idea of the extent and variety of merchandise imported and sold by Howell for decades between the 1740s and early 1800s can be seen in his advertisements, such as one in the Pennsylvania Gazette, printed by Benjamin Franklin October 11, 1753 (at left) and another on October 18, 1753, transcribed below:

Just imported in the London, Capt. Shirley, from London, and to be sold by Samuel Howell, at the Sign of the Beaver in Chestnut Street. Ozenbrigs, cotton and linen checks, 10d and 20d nails, powder and shot, Irish linen, a good assortment of silk handkerchiefs, Cumberland and Scots linen ditto, black ell wide and half yd persian, black velvet, a good assortment of cambricks and lawns in pieces and patches, long lawns, 7/8 garlix, dark and light ground colise, two colors and blue ditto stampt cottons, writing paper, French verdigrease, shalloons, Brussels, Camblits, Cloth color, blue green and black calicansoes, worsted damask black China and English toffeties, an assortment of black, flower'd and colour'd ribbons, light and cloth colour'd sewing silk, men's and women's hose, bobbin, Capes, quality binding, best hand metal buttons, an assortment of Scots thread, a good assortment of small books, Dilworth's spelling books, young man's companion, ivory combs, men's and women's gloves, best hyson, souchong tea, in qr canisters, silver watches, stone set in silver, sleeve buttons, best brass sleeve buttons, brown buckram, women's thimbles, pocket compasses with dials, best French gun flints, pepper, nutmegs, cinnamon, cotton, and silk laces, saxon green muffatees, silk cotton and worsted caps, an assortment of women's scarlet and cloth coloured cloaks, mohair twist, ferrets, fine and coarse 6 qr muslin, blue cloth colour, and green broad cloths, nonso-pretty, hat linings, buttons, and loopings, frog loops, coarse and fine bow-strings, pumice stone, seal skin razors, scissors, pistol, cap and cuttoe-knives, gingham holland, kerseys, German serges, red and embossed flannel, shoe and knee buckles &c.

By the mid 18th-century, Howell was diversifying his business and investing in real estate. In addition to vast swaths of farm land and commercial buildings, he acquired the famous Crooked Billet Tavern and Inn, and surrounding land, which demonstrate the extent to which he expanded.

In Philadelphia's early years there were no separate buildings which served as dance halls, theaters, or clubs — taverns, instead, provided all-purpose service. Until the Revolutionary War era, taverns and inns were the largest public buildings in Philadelphia. Drinking establishments in Colonial Philadelphia, be they in the form of coffee houses, taverns, or unlicensed "tippling houses", were more than places to drink and dine. Taverns were where the community conducted business, got its news, argued politics, attended concerts and auctions, socialized, or just plain got polluted.

Between Market and Chestnut Streets the embankment staircase of the Crooked Billet Steps rose from the Crooked Billet Wharf to the Tavern. The Crooked Billet public landing, located at the foot of Chestnut Street, was a bustling wharf where sailing ships docked to off-load their goods and passengers, and took on -board passengers bound for Europe. Regular water taxis sailed from Philadelphia to the New Jersey shore. This pier extended from Water Street onto the Delaware River roughly one hundred feet north of the bottom of Chestnut Street. The original wharf, warehouses and an inn were built by Alice Guest c 1690. The Crooked Billet Tavern and Inn is where, in 1723, Benjamin Franklin had his first hot meal and spent his first night in Philadelphia. At one time, it was the tavern of longest uninterrupted operation in the city.

The Crooked Billet Tavern was located on the site of the present 35 South Front Street, not quite one hundred and fifty feet north of Chestnut Street, and had a frontage of twenty-four feet on both Front and Water streets. Since the tavern had been accommodating strangers as early as 1690, it was reputed to be one of the oldest taverns in town.

Pennsylvania was the overwhelming choice of German immigrants during the middle half of the eighteenth century and Samuel Howell was active in transporting these immigrants. Between 1727 and 1775 there were 317 German immigrant voyages employing 190 different captains. Quite a diverse group of large and small, Philadelphia and non-Philadelphia merchants, were engaged in shipping German immigrants to Philadelphia. When the ships docked at Philadelphia the redemptioner servants were consigned to local merchants who collected the amounts due from their sale. Prepaying passengers did not have to be consigned.

A few merchants specialized in the trade. As a group Stedman, Shoemaker, Willing & Morris, Samuel Howell, and Daniel Beneset gained around 60 percent of the consignments. Between 1763 and 1774 Howell had twelve ships carrying a total of 810 adult male immigrants.

== Proponent, leader and financier of the American Revolution ==
Early on, Howell manifested sympathy for the colonies in their opposition to the exactions and oppressions of the English government, and when the attempt was made to enforce the Stamp Act in Pennsylvania he aligned with those determined to resist its demands.

On October 25, 1765, the merchants and traders of Philadelphia subscribed to the historic Resolution of Non-Importation Made by the Citizens of Philadelphia, which he signed, and was one of the prominent merchants selected as a committee to solicit other signers and to see that the agreement was put into effect, consisting of Thomas Willing, Samuel Mifflin, Thomas Montgomery, Samuel Howell, Samuel Wharton, John Rhea, William Fisher, Joshua Fisher, Peter Chevalier, Benjamin Fuller and Abel James. This level of resistance activity exhausted the patriotism of many merchants, particularly those of the Quaker faith, but not that of Samuel Howell, who, when more heroic measures became necessary, was found among the foremost of those who planned to oppose and defeat the will of the Crown. Howell was also part of the committee responsible for enforcing the Resolution. Undoubtedly the decision was made at the expense of his business because, as can be understood reading his advertisements, once he signed the Non-Importation Resolution he lost access to many of the manufactured goods from England that would have been sold in his shop. The boycott proved to be successful, and British Parliament repealed the Stamp Act in 1766.

Howell was chosen a member of the Committee on Correspondence, composed of forty-three leading citizens. Steps were immediately taken by this body for a convention (or conference, as it was called), to be composed of delegates elected in the several counties of the Province. Howell was elected from Philadelphia, and participated in the convention which met at Carpenters' Hall 15 July 1774, with Thomas Willing as chairman.

By the vote of the convention, the delegates from Philadelphia were constituted a Committee on Correspondence for the province, and Howell remained a member of this important body until 3 July 1775, when it was succeeded by a Council of Safety, of which Benjamin Franklin was the chairman. Howell was active in the business of the council, which was that of raising, arming, and equipping troops, creating a navy, building fortifications, procuring the munitions of war, etc.

Samuel Howell not only voted for such measures, but he served on special committees in furtherance of these ends. The level of his activity is seen in the Minutes of the meeting on November 7, 1775, some of which services are outlined in the following extracts from the proceedings of the council:

Resolved, That Samuel Howell and Col. Cadwalader be appointed to purchase some powder.

Resolved, That Mr. Howell & Mr. Clymer be a committee to enquire into the quantity of sulphur that is now in this city.

Resolved, That it is the opinion of this Board that Mr. Wharton, Mr. Whyte, Mr. Nixon, Mr. Howell, Mr. Rob't Morris & Mr. Clymer, be a committee to contract with such persons as they may think most capable, for the immediate building and equipping a ship of war for the river service, to mount twenty eighteen pounders, and to provide the guns, necessary ammunition, provisions, and other articles fitting for such ship.

Resolved, That it is the opinion of this Board that Mr. Wharton, Mr. Whyte, Mr. Nixon, Mr. Howell, Mr. Rob't Morris & Mr. Clymer, be a committee to contract with such persons as they may think most capable, for the immediate building and equipping a ship of war for the river service, to mount twenty eighteen pounders, and to provide the guns, necessary ammunition, provisions, and other articles fitting for such ship.

Resolved, That as it appears to this Board that the providing a number of Fire Rafts will contribute greatly to defend this city against hostile attacks from Men-of-War; Mr. Howell, Capt. Whyte, Mr. James Biddle, & Mr. Owen Biddle, be a Committee to inquire into the construction of such Fire Rafts, and to give immediate directions for building so many of them as may be necessary, and Report thereon to this Committee.

November 25, 1775:

Resolved, That Messrs. George Clymer, James Mease, Samuel Howell, Owen Biddle, Anthony Wayne, & John Cadwalader, be a Committee, with full powers, to compleat an agreement with Mr. Samuel Potts and Mr. Bustead, for casting a number of heavy canon, and that these gentlemen be requested to take Mr. Rittenhouse with them to Mr. Pott's works, or to take any other measures for effecting this purpose which they may thing proper.

December 15, 1775:

Mr. Samuel Howell informing this Board that he has a considerable quantity of Sea Coal in the Island of Jamaica,

Resolved, That he be requested to write to Jamaica, and give orders for a Load of Coal to be Sent from thence to this place, on account of this Committee, if it can be delivered here at 3s. currency per Bushel, or under.

December 28, 1775:

Resolved, That for the further defence of this Province, a Floating Battery be built; That Samuel Howell, Robert Whyte and George Clymer, be a Committee to have the said Battery completed as soon as possible, and that they purchase the Guns and other necessaries for her.

December 29, 1775:

Colo. Cadwalader & Mr. Howell from the Committee appointed to confer with Morgan Bustead on the Establishment of a Foundary [sic?] for Casting canon

February 1, 1776:

Resolved, that Samuel Howell be joined to Robert Morris, Thomas Wharton, jun'r., & Robert Whyte, the Committee for importing fire-arms, Gunpowder, Salt Petre, &ca., from foreign parts, for the use of this Province, to aid and assist them in that service.

April 8, 1776:

Resolved, That Mr. Howell & Mr. Wharton be a Committee to settle all accounts of Arms purchased by the Captains of the Comp'ys of Associators of the different battalions of this Province, agreeable to a Resolve of this Board of the 23rd January last.

Howell continued a member of the council until 22 July 1776. He was then re-elected, but declined the honor. During the same year he was elected to the assembly, receiving the highest vote in the poll.

== Meeting of Citizens in Philadelphia - November 2, 1775 ==
A transcription of the broadside issued stated:

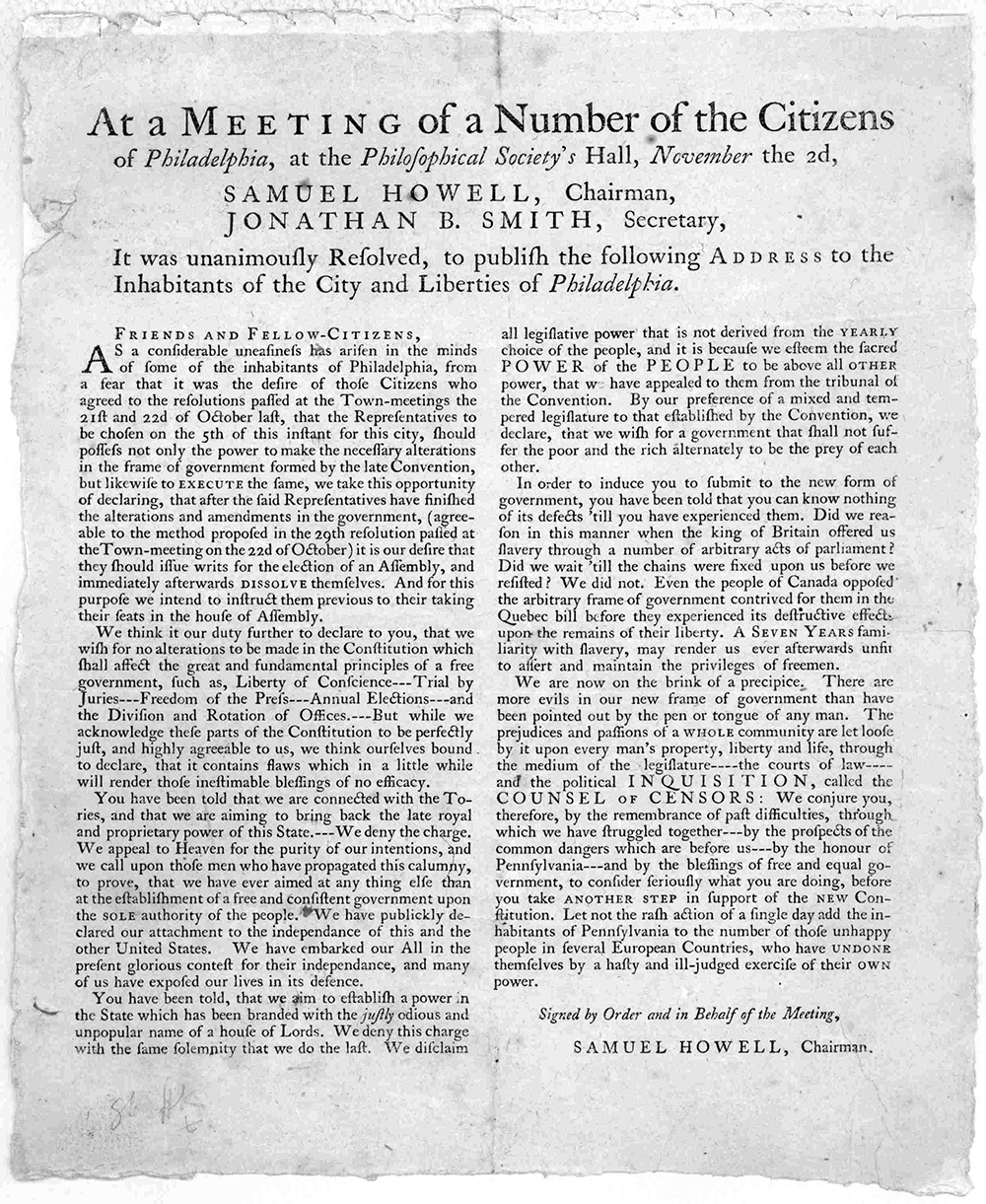
Broadside announcing meeting held November 2, 1775 in Philadelphia

At a meeting of a number of the citizens of Philadelphia, at the Philosophical Society's Hall, November the 2d, Samuel Howell Chairman, Jonathan B. Smith, Secretary.

It was unanimously resolved to publish the following Address to the Inhabitants of the City and Liberties of Philadelphia:

FRIENDS AND FELLOW-CITIZENS: As a considerable uneasiness has arisen in the minds of some of the inhabitants of Philadelphia, from a fear that it was the desire of those citizens who agreed to the resolutions passed at the town meetings the 21st and 22d of October last, that the Representatives to be chosen on the 5th of this instant, for this city, should possess, not only the power to make the necessary alterations in the frame of government formed by the late Convention, but likewise to execute the same, we take this opportunity of declaring that, after the said Representatives have finished the alterations and amendments in the government, (agreeable to the method proposed in the 29th resolution passed at the town meeting of the 2nd of October,) it is our desire that they should issue writs for the election of an Assembly, and immediately afterwards dissolve themselves; and for this purpose we intend to instruct them, previous to their taking their seats in the House of Assembly.

We think it our duty further to declare to you, that we wish for no alterations to be made in the Constitution, which shall affect the great and fundamental principles of a free government; such as liberty of conscience, trial by juries, freedom of the press, annual elections, and the division and rotation of offices. But, while we acknowledge these parts of the Constitution to be perfectly just, and highly agreeable to us, we think ourselves bound to declare that it contains flaws which in a little while will render those inestimable blessings of no efficacy.

You have been told that we are connected with the Tories, and that we are aiming to bring back the late royal and proprietary power of this State. We deny the charge. We appeal to Heaven for the purity of our intentions, and we call upon those men who have propagated this calumny to prove that we have ever aimed at any thing else than at the establishment of a free and consistent government upon the sole authority of the people. We have publickly declared our attachment to the independence of this and the other United States. We have embarked our all in the present glorious contest for their independence, and many of us have exposed our lives in its defence.

You have been told that we aim to establish a power in the State, which has been branded with the justly odious and unpopular name of a House of Lords. We deny this charge with the same solemnity that we do the last. We disclaim all legislative power that is not derived from the yearly choice of the people; and it is because we esteem the sacred power of the people to be above all other power, that we have appealed to them from the tribunal of the Convention. By our preference of a mixed and tempered legislature to that established by the Convention, we declare that we wish for a Government that shall bot suffer the poor and the rich alternately to be the prey of each other.

In order to induce you to submit to the new form of Government, you have been told that you can know nothing of its defects till you have experienced them. Did we reason in this manner when the King of Great Britain offered us slavery through a number of arbitrary acts of Parliament? Did we wait till the chains were fixed upon us before we resisted? We did not. Even the people of Canada opposed the arbitrary frame of Government contrived for them in the Quebeck bill before they experienced its destructive effects upon the remains of their liberty. A seven years' familiarity with slavery may render us ever afterwards unfit to assert and maintain the privileges of freemen.

We are now on the brink of a precipice. There are more evils in our new frame of Government than have been pointed out by the pen or tongue of any man. The prejudices and passions of a whole community are let loose by it upon every man's property, liberty, and life, through the medium of the legislature, the courts of law, and the political inquisition, called the Council of Censors. We conjure you, therefore, by the remembrance of past difficulties, through which we have struggled together-by the prospects of the common dangers which are before us — by the honour of Pennsylvania — and by the blessings of free and equal government, to consider seriously what you are doing, before you take another step in support of the new constitution. Let not the rash action of a single day add the inhabitants of Pennsylvania to the number of those unhappy people in several European countries, who have undone themselves by a hasty and ill-judged exercise of their own power.

Signed by order and in behalf of the meeting:

Samuel Howell, Chairman.

Contemplating the evacuation of Philadelphia by the British, George Washington, in correspondence to Henry Laurens, President of the Continental Congress, from Valley Forge, June 1, 1778, wrote:

If there should be Cloathing &c. suitable for the army, perhaps their might be nothing unjust in the public's taking the preference; and Congress appointing one or two, intelligent, active persons of address, acquainted with the City, and with those who have the goods, with proper powers to purchase them. . . . Some gentlemen have mentioned Messrs. Samuel Howell and Thomas Franklyn as well qualified, both on account of their integrity and attachment to our cause, as from their knowledge of the City and residence in it, ever since the enemy had the possession.

== Financier ==
Samuel Howell, sensing problems at the outset of the Revolutionary War, adroitly conveying his property for safekeeping to Hope & Company, the Amsterdam banking house of Henry Hope, the richest man in Europe at the time. Baring Brothers, the English merchant banking house, acted as agent for Hope & Company after the war purchasing large amounts of American land and discounted securities.

When the British occupied Philadelphia early in the war, Howell was taken prisoner even though he was a Quaker.

Important Revolutionary War financial instruments made to Samuel Howell and some signed by him include Continental Bills of Exchange used to pay interest on the United States debt in French Francs loaned to the fledgling United States by Louis XVI for that express purpose.

In 1781, as a Director of the Bank of North America, Howell was called upon to save the country's finances. The Bank, issued a charter by the Continental Congress and the State of Pennsylvania, made loans from its capital and supplied the need for a circulating medium by issuing notes on the credit of its stock.

After the Revolutionary War, his property still safe in the hands of Hope & Company, and armed with letters of credit from Hope, some men seemed jealous that Howell was thought to have more money than he really had. When the first bank in this country, the Bank of North America (est. 1782) refused to discount some prominent Philadelphian's notes, a group of those excluded tried to start a new bank to compete with the exclusive Bank of North America in 1784–5.

In a letter to Alexander Hamilton dated January 17, 1784, Gouverneur Morris explained:

Howell transferred his Property to the House of Hopes (House of Hope, a Dutch banking house founded by Henry Hope) in Amsterdam at the beginning of the American Revolution. With them it remained during the War and in return, several Dutch men have brought him Letters of Recommendation from that House. This circumstance has raised the Idea that he possesses great Credit abroad, which Credit will, it is supposed give Stability to the Bank. Be this as it may, he is said to be an honest Man, which is no bad thing in any Case.

On March 19, 1791, Howell was appointed by President Washington a commissioner of the First Bank of the United States.

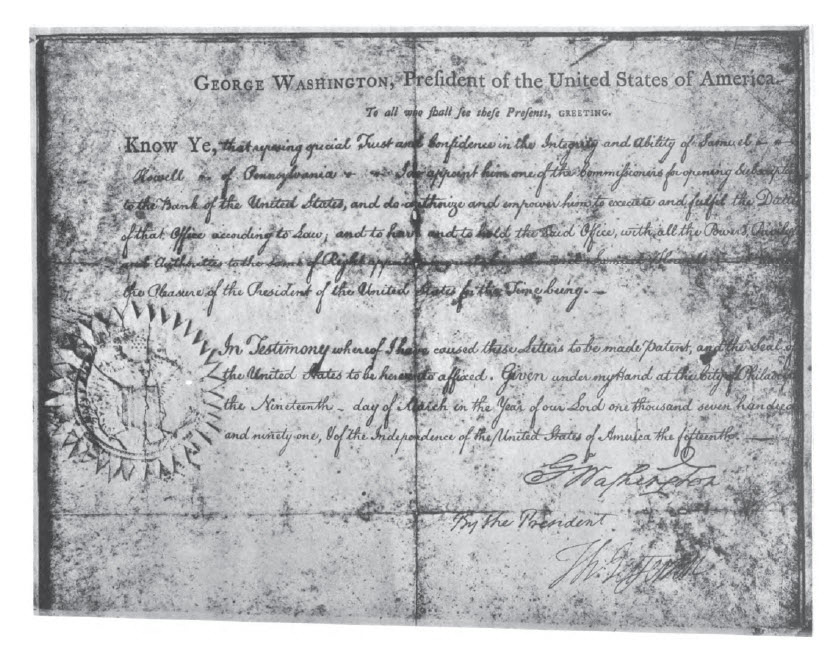
President George Washington's Commission appointing Samuel Howell a Commissioner of the Bank of the United States dated March 19, 1791

Transcription:

To all who shall see these Presents, Greeting.

Know Ye, that reposing special Trust and Confidence in the Integrity and Ability of Samuel Howell of Pennsylvania, I do appoint him one of the Commissioners for opening subscriptions to the Bank of the United States, and do authorize and empower him to execute and fulfill the Duties of that Office according to Law, and to have and to hold the said Office, with all the Powers, Privileges and Authorities to the same of right appointment . . . Pleasure of the President of the United States for the time being.

In Testimony whereof, I have caused these Letters to be made patent, and the Seal of the United States to be hereto affixed. Given under my hand at the City of Philadelphia the Nineteenth day of March in the Year of our Lord one thousand and seven hundred and ninety one, and of the Independence of the United States of America the fifteenth.

G. Washington

By the President.

Th. Jefferson

Alexander Hamilton arranging for the commissions to be signed by President Washington:

To Tobias Lear, March 23, 1791. I find it necessary to request of you the Commissions of the several gentlemen, whom the President was pleased to appoint as Commissioners to receive subscriptions to the Bank of the United States. The persons appointed are: Thomas Willing, David Rittenhouse, Samuel Howell of Pennsylvania.

Howell was one of three commissioners chosen by George Washington for the taking of subscriptions for this new bank. Nothing came of this first freedom of competition movement when a compromise solution was reached between the two rival banking groups and those originally denied banking privileges were allowed to buy into the Bank of North America at the same price as the original stockholders ($400/share), a considerable sum for that era.
