= John Charles Groome =

John Charles Groome may refer to:

- John Charles Groome (Maryland), Maryland Secretary of State
- John Charles Groome (Pennsylvania), commissioner of the Pennsylvania State Police
