= Pennsylvania Hospital =

- University of Pennsylvania Health System

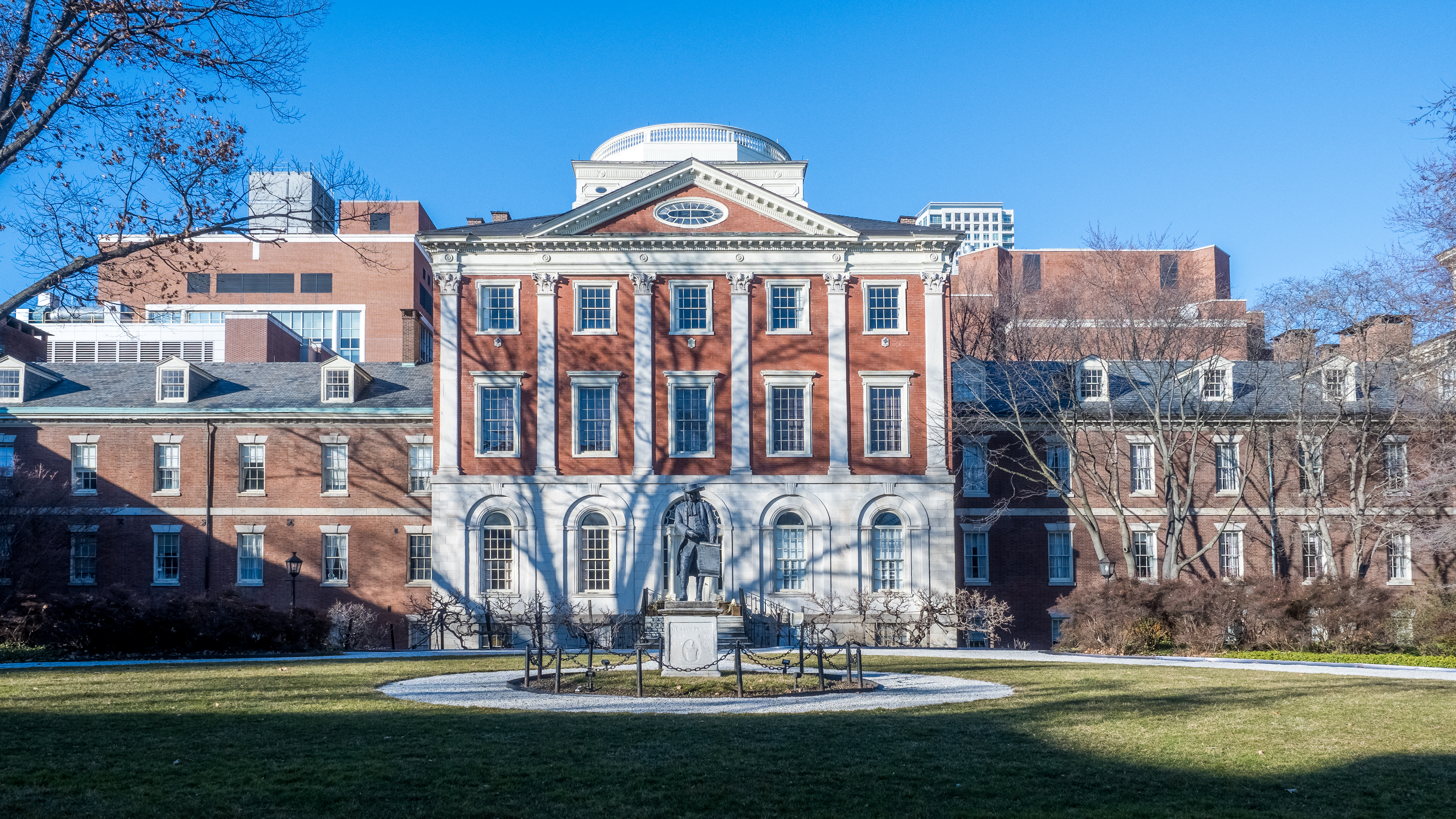
- The Pine building of Pennsylvania Hospital in 2024

- Location within Pennsylvania

Geography
- Location: 800 Spruce Street, Philadelphia, Pennsylvania, United States
- Coordinates: 39°56′41.2″N 75°9′22.56″W

Organization
- Care system: Private
- Type: Teaching
- Affiliated university: Perelman School of Medicine
- Network: University of Pennsylvania Health System

Services
- Emergency department: Yes
- Beds: 515

History
- Founded: 1751

Links
- Website: www.pennmedicine.org/locations/pennsylvania-hospital
- Lists: Hospitals in Pennsylvania
- Pennsylvania Hospital
- U.S. National Register of Historic Places
- U.S. National Historic Landmark
- Pennsylvania state historical marker
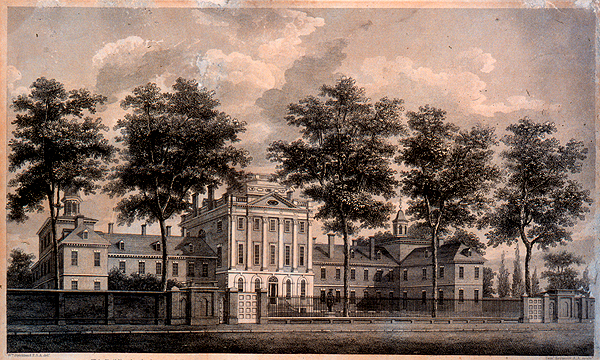
- The Pennsylvania Hospital by William Strickland (1755)
- Location: 800 Spruce Street; Philadelphia, Pennsylvania
- Built: December 17, 1756
- Architect: Samuel Rhoads
- Architectural style: Colonial and Federal (Pine Building)
- NRHP reference No.: 66000688

Significant dates
- Added to NRHP: October 15, 1966
- Designated NHL: June 22, 1965
- Designated PHMC: December 17, 1954

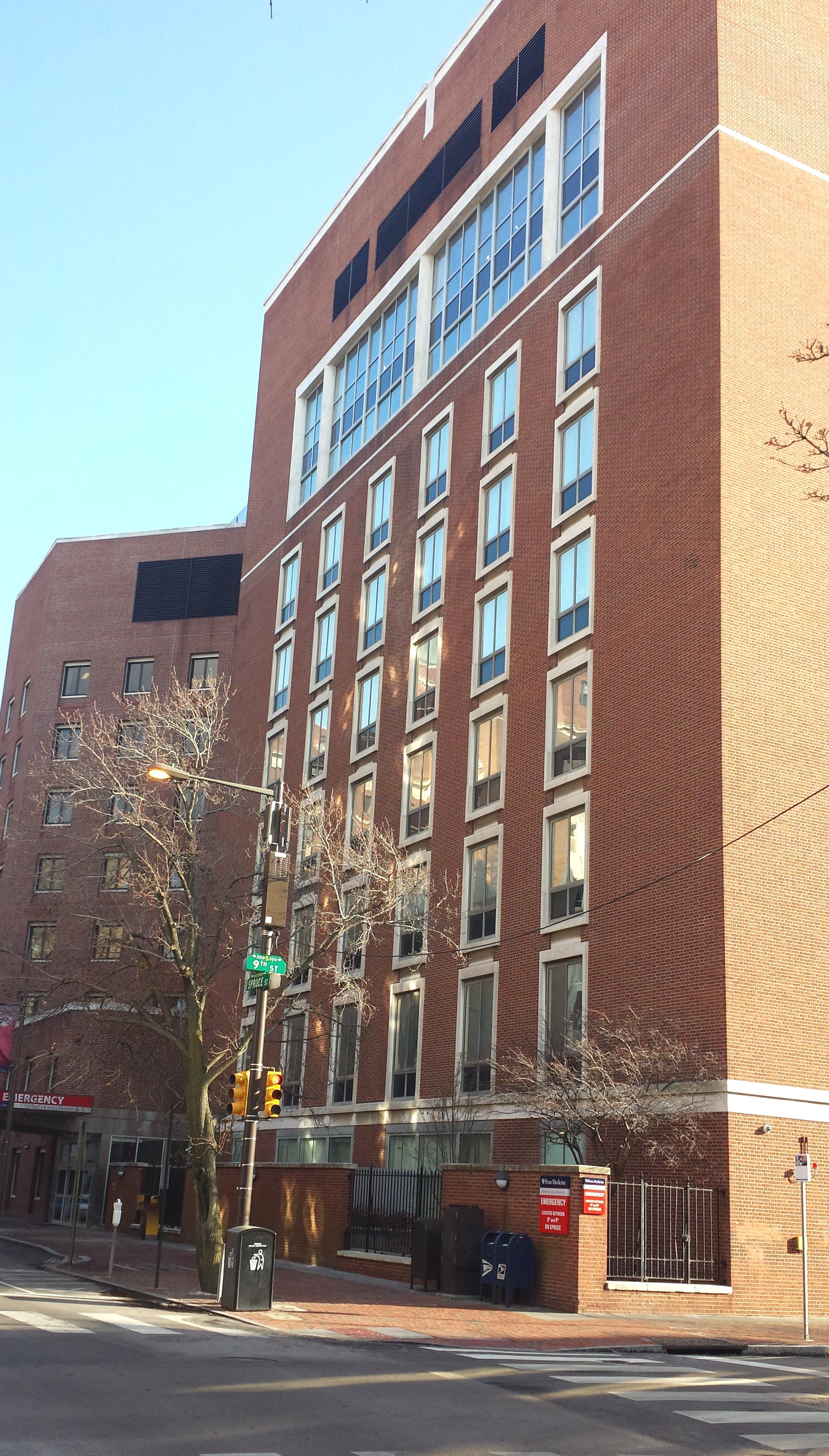
The emergency room entrance at Pennsylvania Hospital at 9th and Spruce streets

Pennsylvania Hospital is a private, non-profit, 515-bed teaching hospital located at 800 Spruce Street in Center City Philadelphia, The hospital was founded on May 11, 1751 by Benjamin Franklin and Thomas Bond. It was the second public hospital in the United States (after only Bellevue Hospital) and had its first surgical amphitheater. (Note: "Although Philadelphia General Hospital (1732) and Bellevue Hospital in New York (1736) are older, the Philadelphia General was founded as an almshouse, and Bellevue as a workhouse".) and its first medical library. It is part of the University of Pennsylvania Health System.

The hospital's main building, dating to 1756, is a National Historic Landmark.

== History ==
=== 18th century ===
Pennsylvania Hospital was originally conceived in 1751 by Thomas Bond as an institution "for the reception and cure of the sick poor...free of charge”. It was funded by "matching grant" to donations of the people of Philadelphia by a bill, which the House passed unanimously on February 7, 1750. Franklin later wrote that, "I do not remember any of my political Manoeuvres, the Success of which gave me at the time more Pleasure." On September 2, 1751, Mathias Koplin donated the first plot of ground for the new hospital.

The first building at the hospital was opened on February 6, 1752, on High Street (now Market Street). Elizabeth Gardner, a Quaker widow, was appointed Matron of the hospital. As the hospital received support of the leading families in Philadelphia, its permanence was secured, and Samuel Rhoads was appointed architect of the new building.

Thomas Stretch was among the leading citizens of Philadelphia and one of the founders of Pennsylvania Hospital. He was a member of the Union Fire Company, also known as Benjamin Franklin's Bucket Brigade, and a founder of the social club known as Schuylkill Fishing Company, and the club's first governor in 1732, re-elected annually until his death in 1765. Stretch was a director of the Philadelphia Contributionship (Hand-in-Hand fire mark) from 1758 to 1761.

In The Pennsylvania Gazette on May 29, 1755, Thomas Stretch appears as one of the largest subscribers with Benjamin Franklin and others to the fund for the Pennsylvania Hospital. The Stretch family and Benjamin Franklin each provided half of the original capital to fund the hospital. The list of subscribers reads:

Subscriber	£	Shillings
Thomas Stretch	10	0
Joseph Stretch	5	8
Isaac Stretch	10	0
Benjamin Franklin	25	0
Robert Harding	1	7

Thomas Stretch and Joseph Stretch were sons of Peter Stretch (1670–1746) and Margery Hall Stretch (1668–1746). It is likely the reference to Isaac Stretch is to Isaac Stretch (1714–1770), son of Daniel Stretch (1694–1746), another son of Peter and Margery Stretch. The Stretch family were Quakers.

Joseph Stretch, mentioned above, was at this time "His Majesty's Collector of Excise for the City and County of Philadelphia", as may be seen from a notice in the Pennsylvania Gazette of October 28, 1756; and subsequently, in 1768, he was "His Majesty’s Collector of Customs, etc., for the Port of Philadelphia". Robert Harding was pastor of St. Joseph's Church.

In 1755, the cornerstone was laid for the East Wing of what would become the hospital's permanent location at 8th and Pine Streets. All of the patients were transferred from the temporary hospital to the permanent hospital on December 17, 1756. The first admission of a new patient occurred on the following day. The site continued to grow through the years with the addition of more wings; the West Wing of the building was built in 1796, and buildings, extra land, and further expansion have since been added.

=== 19th century ===
While attending clinics in the Pennsylvania Hospital in November 1869, the first time women students attended the hospital, Anna Lukens and a Miss Brumall led a line of women students out of the hospital grounds amid hisses, jeers, insults, and thrown stones and mud from male students.

Pennsylvania Hospital gained a reputation as a center of innovation and medical advancement, particularly in the area of maternity. It was a teaching hospital from its very beginning, when Bond would lead rounds through what is now the east wing of the main building. In its early years it was also known for its particularly advanced and humane facilities for mentally ill patients at a time when mental illness was very poorly understood and patients were often treated very badly. Care of the mentally ill was removed to West Philadelphia in 1841 with the construction of the Pennsylvania Hospital for the Insane, later known as The Institute of the Pennsylvania Hospital. Under superintendent Thomas Story Kirkbride, the hospital developed a treatment philosophy that became the standard for care of the mentally ill in the 19th century.

=== 20th century ===
In 1950, Pennsylvania Hospital was recognized for becoming more highly specialized as it established, in addition to its sophisticated maternity programs, an intensive care unit for neurological patients, a coronary care unit, an orthopaedic institute, a diabetes center, a hospice, specialized units in oncology and urology and broadened surgical programs.

The hospital has served as a center for treating the war wounded. Patients were brought to the hospital for treatment in the Revolutionary War, the American Civil War and the Spanish–American War, and units from the hospital were sent abroad to treat wounded in World War I and in the Pacific theater of World War II.

The seal of the hospital, chosen by Franklin and Bond, incorporates the biblical story of the Good Samaritan; it includes the sentence "Take Care of Him and I will repay Thee".

In 1996, Patricia A. Ford established the bloodless medicine program at Pennsylvania Hospital and performed the first successful bloodless stem-cell transplant.

In 1997, Pennsylvania Hospital's Board of Managers made the decision to merge with the University of Pennsylvania Health System. The large health system helps to support the formerly stand-alone hospital with its network of resources.

=== 21st century ===
In 2001, Pennsylvania Hospital celebrated its 250th anniversary. The Center for Transfusion-Free Medicine at Pennsylvania Hospital has evolved into a major national bloodless center that treats more than 1300 inpatients per year.

== Reputation ==
Pennsylvania Hospital ranks among the top 100 hospitals in the country according to Healthgrades 2024 and 2025 Best Hospitals rankings, placing it in the top 2% nationwide. According to US News & World Report Pennsylvania Hospital is ranked 7th among hospitals in the state of Pennsylvania and 3rd among 12 hospitals ranked in the Philadelphia metropolitan area. It also achieved a high-performing status across six subspecialties. Obstetrics & Gynecology was ranked 45th in the nation among 4,855 hospitals. Pennsylvania Hospital ranked 8th on Fortune/PINC AI 100 Top Teaching Hospitals in 2023.

=== Internal Medicine Residency ===
The 2018 Becker's Hospital Review listed the internal medicine residency program at Pennsylvania Hospital 19th in the country. According to the Doximity residency Navigator 2024-2025 internal medicine rankings, in the category "Reputation" Pennsylvania Hospital is 31st in the country of 634 programs.

=== Obstetrics & Gynecology Residency ===
According to the Doximity residency Obstetrics & Gynecology rankings, in the category "Reputation" Pennsylvania Hospital is 48th in the country of 298 programs.

== Historic firsts ==
=== Historic library ===
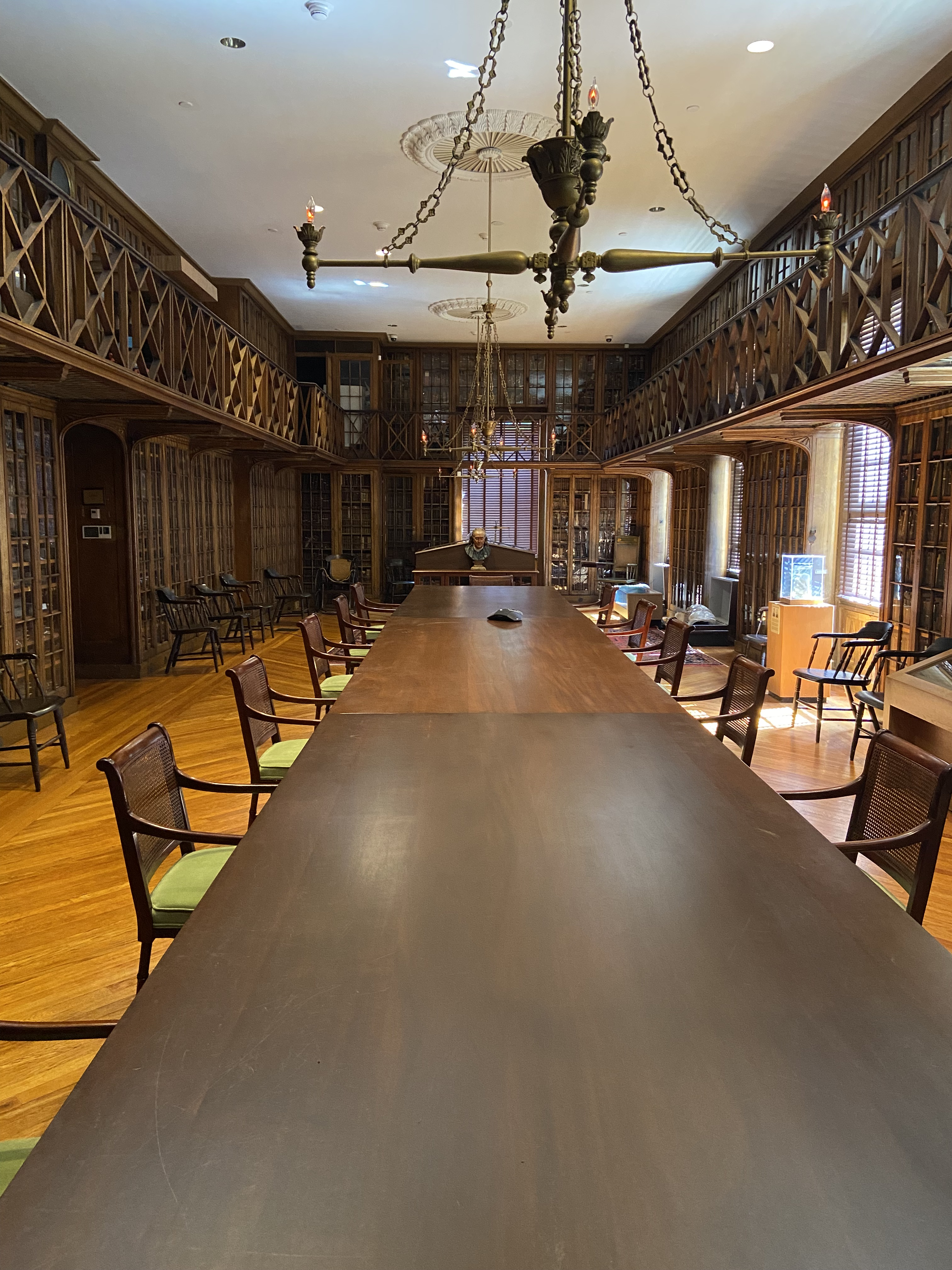
Pennsylvania Hospital Historic Medical Library

In 1762, the first book for the hospital's medical library was donated by John Fothergill, a British friend of Franklin's. In 1847, the American Medical Association designated the library as the first, largest, and most important medical library in the United States. That year, in 1847, the library contained about 9,000 volumes. The collection now contains over 13,000 volumes dating back to the 15th century—including medical and scientific volumes as well as books on natural history. The library includes the nation's most complete collection of medical books published between 1750 and 1850. The collection also contains several incunabula, books written before 1501, when the printed process was invented.

=== Surgical amphitheater ===
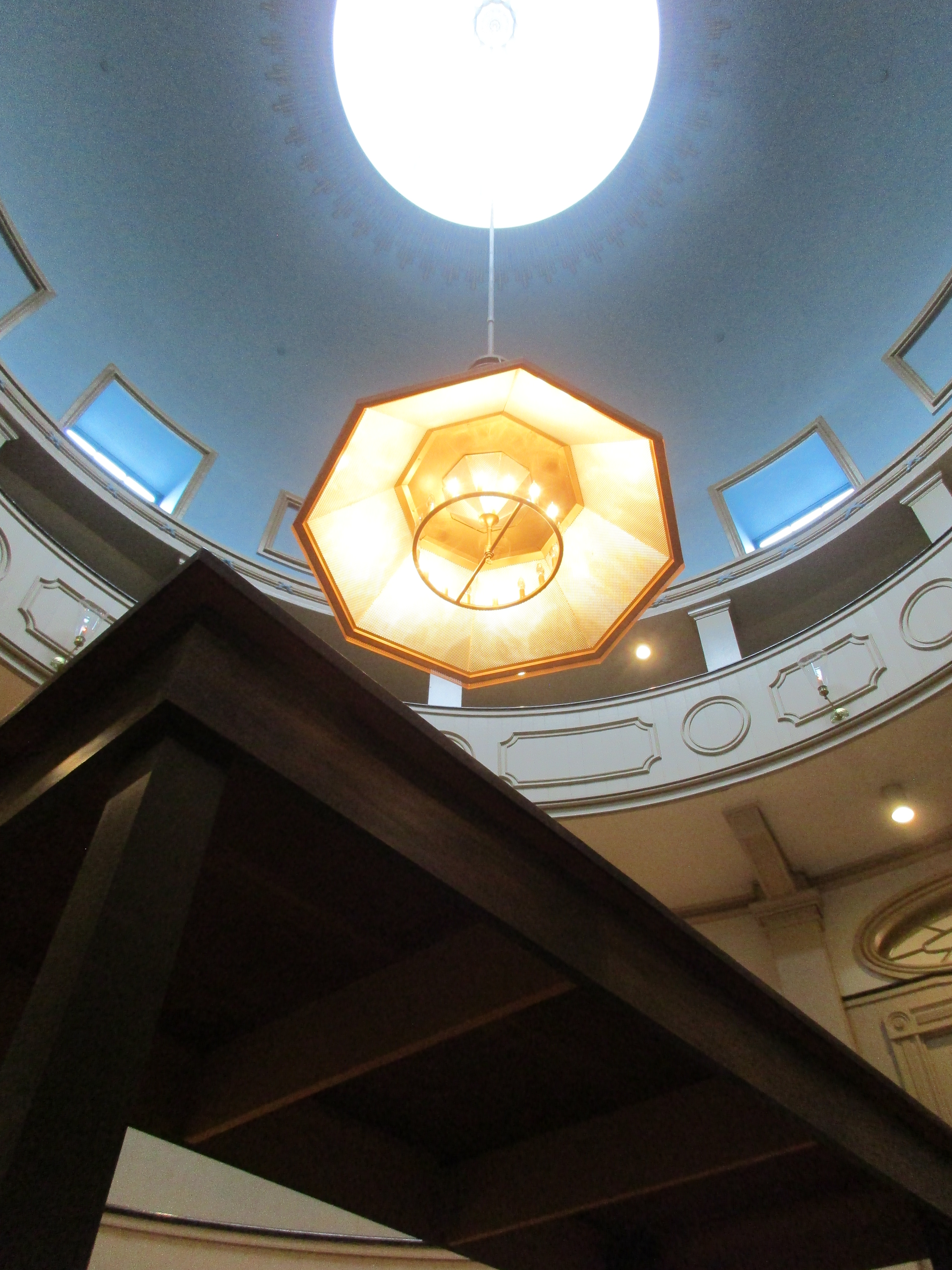
The surgical amphitheater in the historic Pennsylvania Hospital building

The top floor of Pennsylvania Hospital is the home of the nation's oldest surgical amphitheater, which served as the operating room from 1804 through 1868. Surgeries were performed on sunny days between 11:00 am and 2:00 pm since there was no electricity at the time. The surgical amphitheater seats 180 and with those standing, up to 300 people might be present during any given surgical operation.

=== Physic garden ===
The Board of Managers first proposed the Physic Garden in 1774 to provide physicians with ingredients for medicines. The idea was approved, but financial circumstances intervened and the project was delayed for two centuries. In 1976, the planting of the garden was the bicentennial project of the Philadelphia Committee of the Garden Club of America and the Friends of Pennsylvania Hospital. Located in front of the Pine Building's West Wing, the garden has plants that were once used for medicines to stimulate the heart, ease toothaches, relieve indigestion, and cleanse wounds in the 18th century.

=== Maternity firsts ===
Pennsylvania Hospital is noted for its many firsts in the area of women's medicine, especially in maternity. In 1803, the hospital established a "lying-in" (or maternity) department. This lasted until 1854 when obstetrics and gynecology took a 75-year break at the hospital. The specialties were reinstated in 1929 with the opening of the Woman's Building (now the Spruce Building) which sported 150 adult beds, 80 bassinets, 2 operating rooms, a series of labor and delivery rooms, and outpatient clinics. It was considered "one of the most modern hospital buildings in the country" especially at a time when women's medicine was not thought to be very important and most births were still done at home. This was followed in 1978 with the first Antenatal Testing Unit (ATU) in the region and in 1985 when the first GIFT (Gamete IntraFallopian Transfer) pregnancy in Philadelphia was achieved at the hospital. In 1987, Pennsylvania Hospital achieved two obstetrical firsts: the first birthing suite in a tertiary care hospital in the state was opened, and the first gestational carrier and egg donor programs in the Philadelphia metropolitan area were begun to complement the hospital's existing fertility services. In 1995, the hospital was the first in the region to achieve 1,000 live births from in-vitro fertilization, GIFT, and other assisted reproductive technologies.

== Notable physicians ==
- Benjamin Rush, on staff from 1783 until 1813, he was a medical teacher, a social reformer, and a signer of the Declaration of Independence.
- Philip Syng Physick, on staff from 1794 until 1816, he achieved fame through his surgical prowess.
- C. Everett Koop, intern in 1941, Surgeon General of the United States from 1982 to 1989. Koop completed residency training at Pennsylvania hospital.
- Andrew von Eschenbach, intern, 1963, a director at biotechnology company BioTime, served as the 20th United States FDA Commissioner.
- Patricia A. Ford, on staff since 1996, Director for the Center of Bloodless Medicine, performed the first bloodless stem cell transplant in 1995.
- George Bacon Wood (1797–1879) served as physician at Pennsylvania Hospital for 24 years, president of the American Medical Association, the College of Physicians of Philadelphia, and the American Philosophical Society

== See also ==
- University of Pennsylvania Health System
- Hospital of the University of Pennsylvania ("HUP") – A separate hospital also affiliated with the Penn Health System.
- Penn Presbyterian Medical Center ("Presby")
- List of National Historic Landmarks in Philadelphia
- List of the oldest hospitals in the United States
- National Register of Historic Places listings in Center City, Philadelphia
