= Thomas Stretch =

American Clockmaker and Governor

Personal details
- Born: March 30, 1697 Leek, Staffordshire, England
- Died: October 19, 1765 (aged 68) Philadelphia, Province of Pennsylvania, British America
- Party: Independent
- Spouse: Mary Anne Robins
- Children: Peter Stretch II
- Profession: Clockmaker

Thomas Stretch (March 30, 1697 – October 19, 1765) was an American clockmaker, founder and first governor of the Colony in Schuylkill, later known as the State in Schuylkill, or Schuylkill Fishing Company. In 1753, he erected the first clock at Independence Hall in Philadelphia, a large clock dial and masonry clock case at the west end of the structure.

== Early life and education ==
Stretch was born in Staffordshire, England, on March 30, 1697. In 1702, along with his father Peter Stretch, he came to Philadelphia in what was then the colonial-era Province of Pennsylvania. The earliest known clockmakers in Leek, Staffordshire were members of the Quaker family named Stretch. Samuel Stretch, Peter Stretch's uncle, was making lantern clocks in Leek in 1670.

== Career ==
=== Clockmaker ===
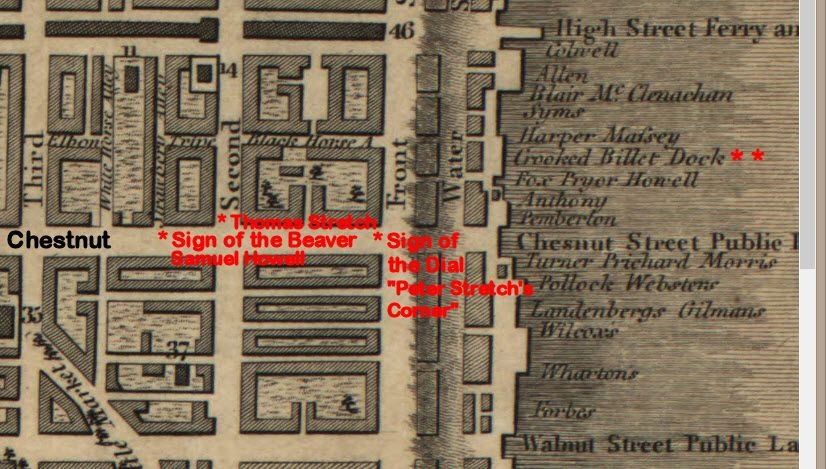
The "Sign of the Dial" at Front and Chestnut Streets in Philadelphia, where Stretch apprenticed and plied his trade as a clockmaker at a location known as Peter Stretch's Corner, which he inherited from his father in 1746.

Independence Hall in 1799, showing Stretch's giant clock on the far left

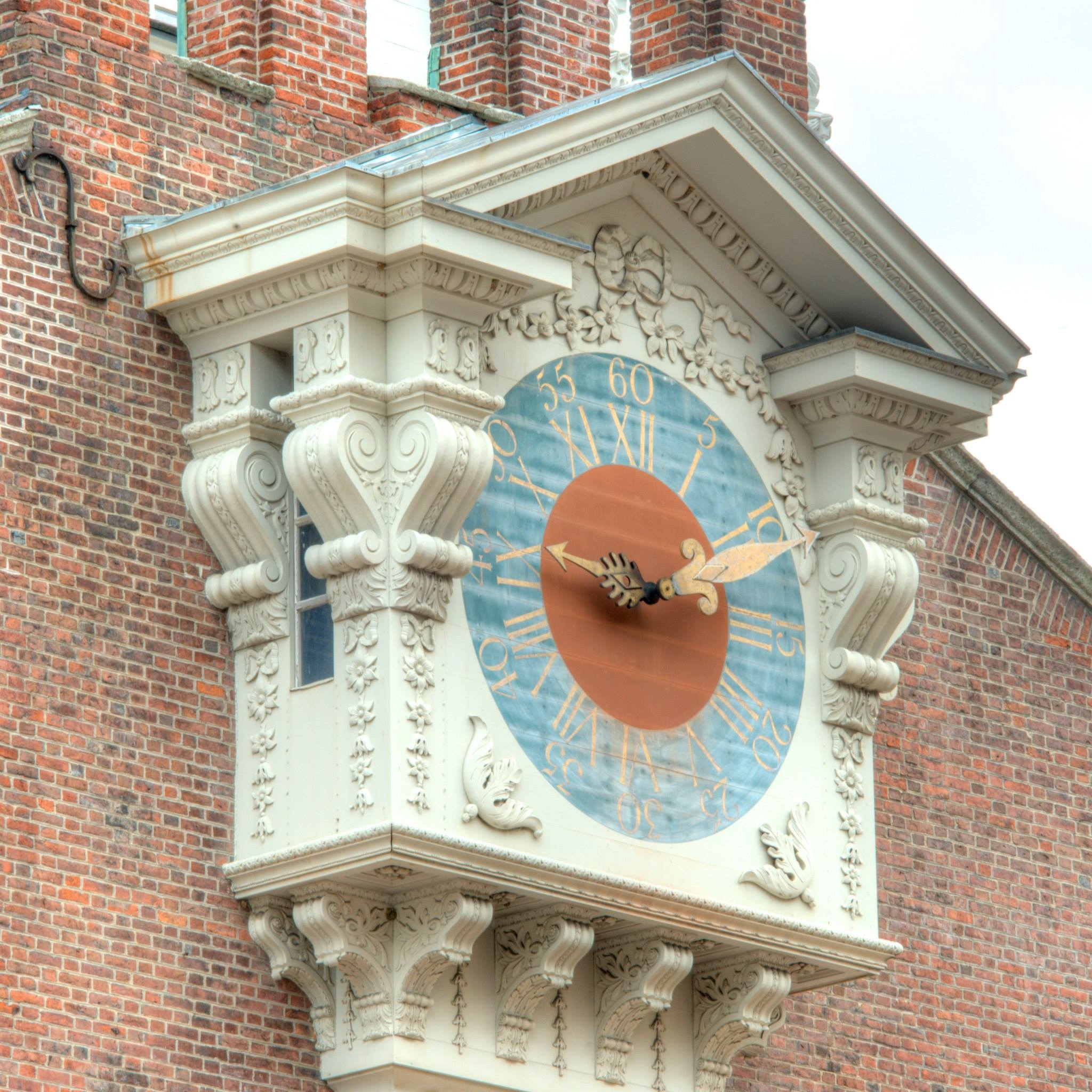
Stretch's clock on Independence Hall in Philadelphia, restored in 1973

Around 1747 or 1748, Thomas sold his father's property and Front and Chestnut Streets, and consolidated the business a block further west, at his second property at the southwest corner of Second and Chestnut, one block east of son-in-law Samuel Howell's property, "Sign of the Beaver", at the corner of Strawberry Alley and Chestnut Street. Howell also owned the Crooked Billet Tavern and its dock, which is detailed in "Plan of the City of Philadelphia and its Environs (Showing the Improved Parts)," published in 1797.

Stretch's father, Peter Stretch, became one of the most important clockmakers in colonial America, was noted for his magnificent tall case clocks, intricate watches and clocks, and scientific instruments. His shop was at the southeast corner of Front and Chestnut Streets, Philadelphia, Pennsylvania, USA, then called "Peter Stretch's Corner at the Sign of the Dial".

Soon after his father's death, Stretch sold his father's property at the Sign of the Dial and established himself a block farther west, at the southwest corner of Second and Chestnut Streets.

==== Independence Hall ====
During his prime years, Thomas Stretch was probably the most competent clockmaker in Philadelphia. In 1752, when Issac Norris was selecting a man to build the first clock for the State House, known now as Independence Hall, he chose Thomas Stretch, the son of his old friend and fellow council member, to do the job.

In 1753, Thomas Stretch erected a large clock dial and masonry clock case at the west end of Independence Hall in Philadelphia. That equipment, which resembled a giant tall clock (grandfather clock), had been removed in about 1830. The clock's dials were mounted at the east and west ends of the main building connected by rods to the clock movement in the middle of the building.

The western end had a masonry structure designed to look like the clock case. The acquisition of the original clock and bell by the Pennsylvania Colonial Assembly is closely related to the acquisition of the Liberty Bell. By mid-1753, the clock had been installed in the State House attic, but six years were to elapse before Thomas Stretch received any pay for it.

During the summer of 1973, a replica of the Stretch clock was restored to Independence Hall. The $159,000 replica included a 14-foot copy of the clock case atop a 40-foot soapstone column, just the way it looked during the American Revolutionary War. To lessen danger of deterioration, the original delicate wood carvings were instead cast in polyester bronze. The only major concession in modernism: the clock, with an eight-foot dial painted red-brown and Persian blue, is powered by electricity rather than wooden works and weights.

While conducting a study of early clockmakers in Philadelphia, Carolyn Stretch located 20 clocks in the Philadelphia area by Peter Stretch (1670–1746), seven by his son Thomas Stretch (1695–1765), and two by Thomas' brother William Stretch (1701–1748). Watches made by Thomas Stretch were also greatly treasured by their owners. That she had not been so successful in locating many of the clocks made by Thomas Stretch is attributed to the fact that they have reached the hands of dealers and been scattered across the country. By 1710, the Stretch clocks had not only a minute hand but also a second hand. The most sophisticated Peter Stretch clock found was owned by The State in Schuylkill.

==== Other notable clocks ====
Among the known tall case clocks with works by Thomas Stretch are one exhibited in the Governor's Palace at Colonial Williamsburg; one with a walnut case at the Philadelphia Museum of Art/ and one illustrated in William Distin and Robert Bishop, The American Clock, 1976, no.37. An eight-day tall case clock by Thomas Stretch, circa 1740, is at Keith House-Washington's Headquarters, the historic home of Governor William Keith, in Graeme Park and administered by the Pennsylvania Historical and Museum Commission. An eight-day tall clock by Thomas Stretch is located in The Club Room at The County House, Wilmington DE, donated by a resident.

A Queen Anne carved and figured mahogany tall case clock, by Peter Stretch in Philadelphia, built around 1740, was bought at auction by Winterthur Museum and Country Estate on October 28, 2004, for $1.7 million, the highest price ever paid for an American clock.

=== Civic activities ===
Stretch was one of the founders of Pennsylvania Hospital and a member of the Union Fire Company, also known as Benjamin Franklin's Bucket Brigade. He was a director of the Philadelphia Contributionship from 1758 to 1761.

In the Pennsylvania Gazette of May 29, 1755, Thomas Stretch appears as one of the largest subscribers (with Benjamin Franklin and others) to the fund for the Pennsylvania Hospital. In essence, the Stretch family and Benjamin Franklin provided half of the original capital to found the hospital. The list of subscribers reads:

Subscriber	£	Shillings
Thomas Stretch	10	0
Joseph Stretch	5	8
Isaac Stretch	10	0
Benjamin Franklin	25	0
Robert Harding	1	7

Thomas Stretch and Joseph Stretch were sons of Peter Stretch (1670–1746) and Margery Hall (1668–1746). It is likely the reference to Isaac Stretch is to Isaac Stretch (1714–1770), son of Daniel Stretch (1694–1746), another son of Peter Stretch and Margery Hall. The Stretch family were Quakers.

Joseph Stretch, mentioned above, was at this time "His Majesty's Collector of Excise for the City and County of Philadelphia", as may be seen from a notice in the Pennsylvania Gazette of October 28, 1756; and subsequently, in 1768, he was "His Majesty's Collector of Customs, etc., for the Port of Philadelphia". Robert Harding was pastor of St. Joseph's Church.

=== Schuylkill Fishing Company ===
The founders of the social club known as Schuylkill Fishing Company numbered twenty, each of whom was either then or later prominent in Philadelphia's business and civic life. Like Stretch, many of the early members were Quakers. When its organization took on formal shape, it was an emulation of the government of the Province of Pennsylvania. Stretch was named the club's first governor in 1732, and re-elected annually until his death in 1765. He was member No. 1, elected May 1, 1732.

Under Governor Stretch, the colony in Schuylkill prospered in its peaceful pursuits. In 1747, they resolved to build a "Court House" for the meetings of the Governor, Assembly, and colonists, on the slope facing the river, amid the stately walnut trees, some of which furnished the timber. In 1748, its members built their first Court House near Philadelphia, on the west side of the Schuylkill River where Girard Avenue Bridge now crosses. The place was then a wilderness with immense quantities of fish filling the river.

With much mock formality and discipline, the Schuylkill Fishing Company pursued its piscatorial and fowling interests, upon the success of which depended their meals. Fish or game not caught or killed by its members was not allowed to be served. The annual election of officers, at which Governor Stretch was regularly returned, took place each October. Something of the flavor of the Colony's procedures may be sensed in a proclamation issued by Governor Stretch on September 29, 1744, "the twelfth year of my Government". Evidently in an effort to encourage his colonists to promote game for the year's final meeting on October 4, Stretch called to their attention by Proclamation:

Colony of Schuylkill, ss.

To and all other Schuylkillians whom it may concern.

Whereas great quantities of rabbits, squirrels, pheasants, partridges, and others of the game and kind have presumed to infest the coasts and territories of the Schuylkill in a wild, bold and ungovernable manner; these are therefore to authorize and require you, or any of you, to make diligent search for said rabbits, squirrels, partridges and others of the game kind, in all suspected places where they may be found, and bring the respective bodies of so many as you shall find, before the Justices, etc., at a general court to be held on Thursday, the fourth day of October next, there to be proceeded against, as by the said court shall be adjudged; and for your or any of you are so doing, this shall be your sufficient warrant.

In 1782, "The Colony in Schuylkill" became the "State in Schuylkill".

Thomas Stretch's son, Peter Stretch, his brother, Joseph Stretch, and Joseph's son, Isaac Stretch, were also members of the State in Schuylkill. Samuel Howell, also a member of the State in Schuylkill, married Thomas' niece, Sarah Stretch. Samuel and Sarah Howell's daughter, Sarah Stretch Howell, married Thomas Stretch's son Peter Stretch (1746–1792), also a member, as was Samuel's son, Samuel Howell Jr.

== Personal life ==
On July 29, 1743, Stretch married Mary Anne Robins, who died and was buried in Friends' Burial Ground in Philadelphia, on October 10, 1781, at age 69. Although Thomas followed his father's example in his craft and philanthropy, he did not do so personally. Thomas married out of the Quaker faith and was censured by the Monthly Meeting. As a result, "Thomas Stretch brought in a paper [to the Meeting] signed by himself & Wife condemning their unchaste freedom before Marriage as well as their disorderly procedure in Marriage," surely an embarrassment to his parents.

Of their five children only one lived beyond childhood, Peter Stretch II (1746–1793) who married Sarah Howell (1754–1825), daughter of Samuel Howell (1723–1807), eminent Philadelphia merchant and a financier of the American Revolution and Sarah Stretch (1727–1770), a daughter of Thomas's brother Joseph Stretch. Thomas and Mary's daughters included Mary Stretch (who died in 1744), Elizabeth Stretch (who died in 1747) Ann Stretch (who died in 1750), and Sarah Stretch (who died in 1756).

== Death ==
Stretch died on October 19, 1765, at age 68 and was buried at Friends Burial Ground in Philadelphia.

His son Peter, who was not of age when Thomas made his will in 1760, was left his clocks, watches, tools, etc. Half of his property went to his beloved wife Mary. Thomas Stretch's brother, Joseph, and his nephew Isaac Stretch were his executors. The will is proved October 23, 1765.
