= Patricia A. Ford =

- Born: September 27, 1955 (age 71); Camden, New Jersey, U.S.
- Education: Barry University (B.A.); University of Miami Miller School of Medicine (M.D.)
- Occupations: Physician, oncologist, hematologist
- Employer: University of Pennsylvania Health System
- Known for: Bloodless medicine and surgery
- Title: Medical Director, Center for Bloodless Medicine; Chief Medical Officer, Chromie Health

Patricia Ann Locantore-Ford (born September 27, 1955) is an American physician, oncologist, and hematologist. She serves as the Medical Director of the Clinical Research Unit, Cellular Therapeutic and Transplant Programs, and Transfusion Medicine Programs at Pennsylvania Hospital in Philadelphia, and is a Clinical Professor of Medicine at the Perelman School of Medicine at the University of Pennsylvania. She is also the Chief Medical Officer of Chromie Health.

Ford is known for her work in bloodless medicine and bloodless surgery. In 1995, she performed the world’s first bloodless autologous stem cell transplant on a Jehovah’s Witness patient, and has since completed the largest known series of transplants without the use of blood products by any individual physician.

She founded the Center for Bloodless Medicine and Surgery at Pennsylvania Hospital, which now treats more than 1,300 inpatients annually.

== Education ==
Ford received her B.A. in Science from Barry University in 1983 and her medical degree from University of Miami's Miller School of Medicine in 1987. She trained as an intern at Internal Medicine at Graduate Hospital from 1987 to 1988. She then trained as a resident at the Internal Medicine at Graduate Hospital from 1988 to 1990. She did her fellowship in hematology and oncology at Temple University Hospital and Fox Chase Cancer Center in Philadelphia, from 1990 to 1993. Ford is board-certified in Internal Medicine, Hematology, and Oncology, and is a founding member and previous president of the Society for the Advancement of Blood Management (SABM). Her clinical interests include autologous transplant, CAR-T therapy, gynecologic and breast cancers, and benign hematology, including anemia and coagulopathy management.

== Career ==
Ford's clinical innovations include the use of erythropoietic-stimulating agents, intravenous iron, antifibrinolytics, and patient-specific strategies to minimize blood loss and avoid transfusion.

In 2001, Ford founded the Society for the Advancement of Blood Management (SABM), an organization which promotes bloodless medicine.

Ford currently serves as a Clinical Professor of Medicine at the University of Pennsylvania and as Medical Director of both the Center for Bloodless Medicine and the Autologous Transplant Program at Pennsylvania Hospital. She is also the Director of the Peripheral Stem Cell Program and Clinical Research Unit-East.

In 2023, she was appointed to the Comprehensive Patient Blood Management (cPBM) Medical Advisory Board at Accumen, which contributes to national PBM policy development and hospital implementation strategies.

== Advocacy ==
Ford is an advocate for bloodless medicine with regards to Jehovah’s Witness patients, whose religious beliefs prevent blood transfusions. She has successfully performed over 250 bloodless transplants, and her program has demonstrated outcomes comparable to conventional approaches, including similar survival and remission rates.

== Recognition ==
Ford’s work has been recognized in both medical literature and mainstream media for its innovation and ethical significance. She has been profiled by publications including The New Yorker, The Seattle Times, and Stanford Medicine Magazine.
