= Fish house punch =

Rum-based cocktail

Fish-House Punch
There's a little place just out of town,
Where, if you go to lunch,
They'll make you forget your mother-in-law
With a drink called Fish-House Punch.
An early-known print reference to Fish-House Punch is in "The Cook" (1885).

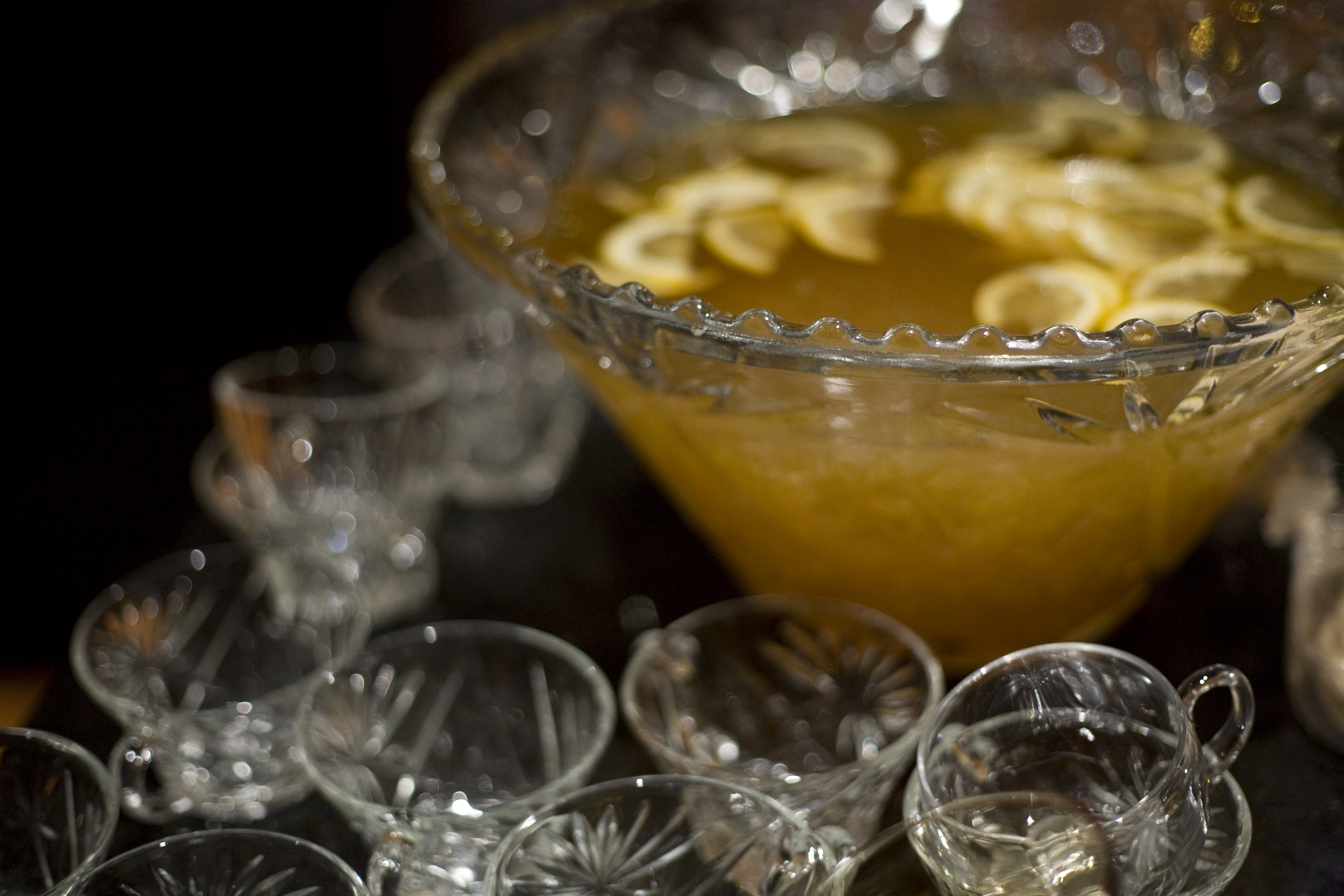
Fish House Punch

Fish house punch is a strong, rum-based punch containing rum, cognac, and peach brandy. The drink is typically served over an ice block in a punch bowl and garnished with lemon slices.

== History ==
It is held to have been first concocted in 1732 at Philadelphia's fishing club, the State in Schuylkill, also known as the "fish house".

A 1744 note by the secretary of an embassy of Virginia Commissioners contains what may be the earliest record of the punch. Meeting local notables at the Schuylkill River in Philadelphia, he described being served "a Bowl of fine Lemon Punch big enough to have Swimmed half a dozen of young Geese."

America's first president, George Washington, indulged in thirteen toasts – one for each state – during a victory celebration at New York's Fraunces Tavern, and it is said that after he partook of fish house punch at Philadelphia's State in Schuylkill, he couldn't bring himself to make an entry in his diary for the following three days.

The State in Schuylkill fish house punch is traditionally made in a large bowl that did double duty as a baptismal font for citizens' infants. "Its an ample space ... would indeed admit of total immersion," one citizen noted.

The "fish house" is said to have been a gentlemen's club devoted to cigars, whiskey, and the occasional fishing foray upon the Chesapeake or upon the Restigouche River in Canada. Another version states that it was created in 1848 by Shippen Willing of Philadelphia, to celebrate the momentous occasion of women being allowed into the premises of the "fish house" for the first time in order to enliven the annual Christmas party. It was supposed to be just "something to please the ladies' palate but get them livelier than is their usual wont."

The punch, which contains rum, cognac, and peach brandy, is potent, so it is normally diluted with cold lemonade or sometimes with cold black tea and called tea punch, or with seltzer water as that became available in the 19th century. Some punch bowls may not be large enough to accommodate the large ice block called for, and it can be served in a pitcher over ice cubes.

== See also ==
- Ti' punch, a rum-based mixed drink that is especially popular in French-speaking Caribbean states
