= Schuylkill Fishing Company =

Historic angling club in Pennsylvania

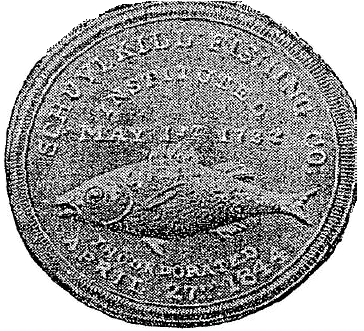
- Schuylkill Fishing Company logo

- Location within Pennsylvania
- Formation: 1732
- Type: Private NGO
- Location: Andalusia, Pennsylvania
- Coordinates: 40°3′43.57″N 74°57′59.35″W
- Formerly called: Colony in Schuylkill

The Schuylkill Fishing Company of Pennsylvania, also known as the State in Schuylkill, was the first angling club in the Thirteen Colonies and remains the oldest verified continuously operating social club in the English-speaking world.

== History ==
The club was established in 1732 as the Colony in Schuylkill under a treaty with the chiefs of the Lenni-Lenape (Delaware) Indians. Officers of the club assumed governmental titles: governor, lieutenant governor, three councilors, sheriff, coroner, secretary. Among its 28 founding members were James Logan, Philip Syng, and Joseph Wharton; the first Governor was Thomas Stretch (born Staffordshire, England, 1695), who held the office for 34 years. Other early members included Samuel Howell, Thomas Wharton Jr., Tench Francis Jr., William Bradford, Samuel Nicholas, Clement Biddle, William Bingham, Mayor Anthony Morris, Thomas Mifflin, and Samuel Morris, second governor for 46 years. In 1737, membership was limited to twenty-five. After the American Revolution, in 1782, the club changed its name to "State in Schuylkill", but retained its rules and organization.

The club claims to be the oldest in the world. The Beefsteak Club of London antedates it, but was suspended for a while.

In 1747, the members decided to build a clubhouse, dubbed The Castle, at the foot of the Schuylkill River falls near Fairmount, now part of Philadelphia. It used some of the nearby walnut trees for timber.

During the American Revolution, Samuel Morris, the club's governor, was the captain of the First City Troop, which many other members joined. The club also changed its name to the "State in Schuylkill."

While Philadelphia was the young nation's new capital, President George Washington, an honorary member, was a frequent visitor to the clubhouse, as on June 14, 1787. On July 21, 1825, Gilbert du Motier, Marquis de Lafayette visited the Castle and was elected a member.

When the Fairmount Dam was constructed in 1822, spoiling the fishing at the Falls, the Castle was moved downriver to Rambo's Rock, opposite Bartram's Garden and below Gray's Ferry. On April 27, 1844, the club was incorporated under the name Schuylkill Fishing Company. Between 1876 and 1887, the club occupied the mill building at the confluence of the Wissahickon Creek and Schuylkill River, now occupied by the Philadelphia Canoe Club.

When the fish in the Schuylkill were poisoned by sewage, the club was forced to move again. In 1887, the club bought the Clock House, on the Delaware River at Eddington near Cornwells Heights, two miles above Andalusia. Over the winter of 1887–1888, the Castle and Kitchen were re-erected on this new site, where the Company remained until 1944.

In 1944, the former estate of William B. Chamberlain, Devon House on the Delaware River near Andalusia, Pennsylvania, was conveyed to the State in Schuylkill. The Company moved all of its possessions, including the Castle and Kitchen, to this new site.

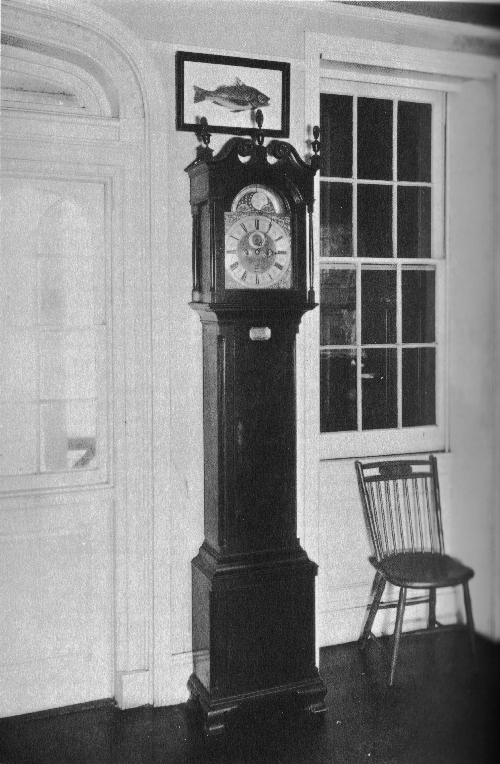
Peter Stretch Tall-case clock, circa 1740, at the State in Schuylkill.

Inside the State House, portraits of the Governors lined the north wall of the entry hall and part of its south side. There were interesting ones of Governors Thomas Stretch and Samuel Morris, and several of the nineteenth century successors, as well as likenesses in oil of all nine Governors who served between 1896 and 1970. The door onto the porch was flanked by a piano and by a tall case clock made by Peter Stretch about 1740, father of the Schuylkill Fishing Company's first Governor, Thomas Stretch, which had been donated by Governor William Fisher Lewis.

The State in Schuylkill was assigned the place of honor in the Grand Centennial Torchlight Procession held July 3, 1876, celebrating the centennial of the Nation's founding. The company was to have served as the personal escort of President Ulysses S. Grant, but since he was unable to attend it escorted the Governor of Pennsylvania and Mayor of Philadelphia throughout the city, passing Independence Hall at midnight amidst the ringing of bells, firing of salutes, and cheers of a large crowd.

On October 13, 1947, 225 years after its founding, members of the Schuylkill Fishing Company dedicated a memorial at the original clubhouse site on West River Drive (now Martin Luther King Drive) in Fairmount Park. The memorial was of gray stone, inset with a tablet of pink marble bearing the inscription:

This is the Original Site of the Colony in Schuylkill

Instituted May 1st 1732 After the War of Independence The Name was changed to the State in Schuylkill The Organization is Still in Active Existence After an Unbroken Record of Over Two Hundred and Fifteen Years

This Tablet was Placed Here in 1947

During the 1950s, when the Schuylkill Expressway was under construction, the Park Commission moved the monument about 200 yards west of the Girard Avenue Bridge (Martin Luther King Drive near Sweet Briar Drive) between West River Drive and the Expressway, some 125 yards from the actual spot where the Castle had stood.

On the frigid winter night of December 21–22, 1980, the State House, its caretaker's wing, and virtually all of its contents were destroyed in a fire. The separate Castle and Kitchen structures were not harmed. A new State House was built on the site in 1981–82.

== Activities ==
The Club designated May 1 as the "opening day" of the sporting season and claimed to have received its rights for fishing and fowling on the river directly from Chief Tammany in 1732. There are 13 appointed fishing days in each year, at equal periods between May 1 and October 1, when the company assembles at the castle and a citizen, designated "Caterer," assisted by the apprentices, prepares the golden perch in the ancient pans and old manner. Each club member serves as an apprentice at some time, and must learn to hold three perch in a long-handled frying pan over the blazing wood fire until one side is done to a tum, then, with a quick twist of his wrist, toss the fish up the old chimney, catching them as they fall on the uncooked side. The perch are served to the company assembled about the ancient table, on one of William Penn's platters presented to the club by his son John who was a member while Governor.

=== Statehood ===
The club maintained a rather ambiguous claim to state sovereignty throughout its early history. During Prohibition in the United States, it claimed that it was unaffected, and continued to openly manufacture and drink alcoholic beverages.

=== Fish House Punch ===
The club is reputed to have been the origin of Fish House Punch, an alcoholic drink consisting mainly of rum.

The first mention of Fish House Punch — though not yet by that name — may be in the notes of William Black, the secretary of an embassy of Virginia Commissioners who visited Philadelphia in 1744. He recounted being met by local poobahs on the bank of the Schuylkill, where they were greeted "very kindly and welcomed . . . into their Province with a Bowl of fine Lemon Punch big enough to have Swimmed half a dozen of young Geese."

The Punch is traditionally made in a large bowl also used as a baptismal font for the citizens' infant sons; "its an ample space . . . . . would indeed admit of total immersion", as one citizen noted. I doubt that there was Punch in it at the time — it was far too precious for such usage, and far too potent.

According to legend, on a visit to the Castle George Washington drank so much of the potent Fish House Punch, he subsequently couldn't bring himself to make an entry in his diary for three days. It was said to be Washington's favorite.

== See also ==
- Fish House Punch
- Old Philadelphians
- List of traditional gentlemen's clubs in the United States
