= John Charles Groome (police officer) =

American police commissioner (1862–1930)

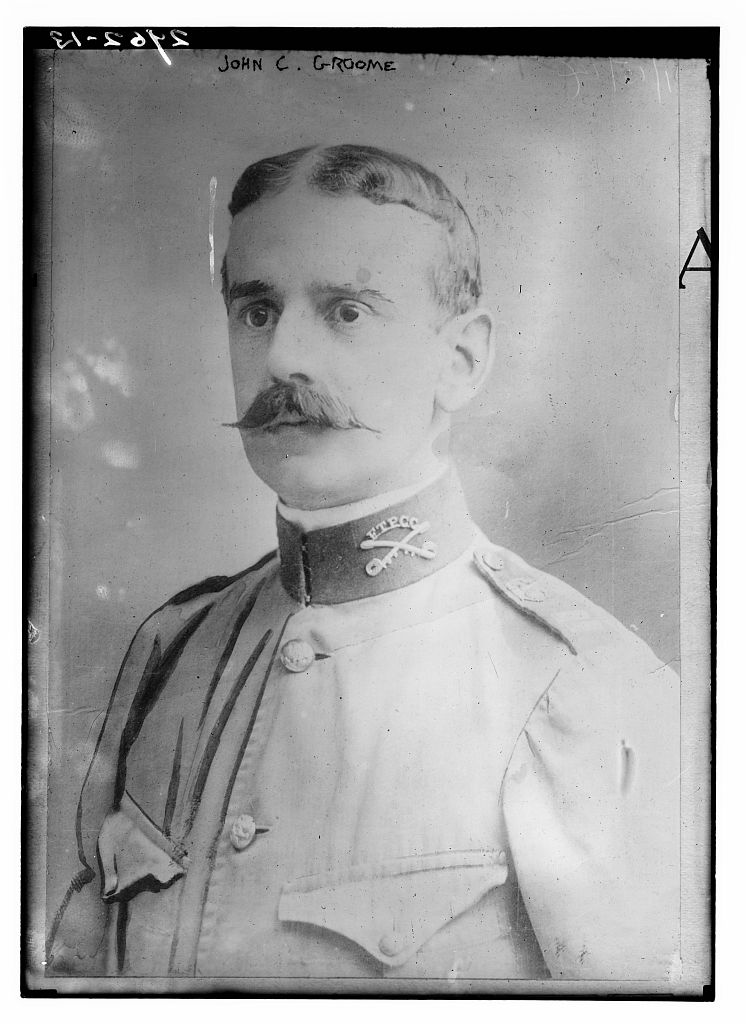

1st Superintendent of the Pennsylvania State Police
- In office July 1, 1905 – February 28, 1920
- Governor: Samuel Pennypacker
- Preceded by: Office established
- Succeeded by: Lynn G. Adams

Warden of the Eastern State Penitentiary
- In office 1923–1928

Personal details
- Born: March 20, 1862 Philadelphia, Pennsylvania, U.S.
- Died: August 31, 1930 (aged 68) Philadelphia, Pennsylvania, U.S.
- Spouse: Agnes Price Roberts (m. 1884–1930)
- Children: 3
- Education: Protestant Episcopal Academy
- Profession: Law enforcement

Military service
- Rank: Colonel
- Battles/wars: World War I

John Charles Groome (March 20, 1862 – August 31, 1930), was the first superintendent of the Pennsylvania State Police from 1905 to 1917. He was the former warden of the Eastern State Penitentiary and a Colonel in World War I.

== Biography ==
He was born in Philadelphia, Pennsylvania on March 20, 1862, to Samuel William Groome and Nancy Andrew Connelly. He graduated from the Protestant Episcopal Academy in 1878. He became a member of the First Troop Philadelphia City Cavalry in 1882. On April 15, 1884, he married Agnes Price Roberts (1868–1937), and had three children.

In the First Troop Philadelphia City Cavalry he was promoted to corporal in 1887, then sergeant in 1889. He was promoted to captain in 1896. He was active in the Homestead Strike in 1892 and the Coal Strike of 1902 in 1902. On July 1, 1905, he became the first superintendent of the Pennsylvania State Police. He served as a colonel in World War I.

He retired from the Pennsylvania State Police on February 28, 1920, and died August 31, 1930, at the age of 68.
