= Peter Stretch =

American clockmaker (1670–1746)

Personal details
- Born: October 14, 1670 Leek, Staffordshire, England
- Died: September 11, 1746 (aged 76) Philadelphia, Pennsylvania
- Party: Independent
- Spouse: Margery Hall
- Children: Thomas Stretch, Daniel Stretch, William Stretch, Joseph Stretch, Elizabeth Stretch, Sarah Stretch
- Profession: Clockmaker

Peter Stretch (October 14, 1670 – September 11, 1746) was among the most prominent early American clockmakers and among the first makers of scientific instruments in America.

== Family ==
He was born on October 14, 1670, at Leek, Staffordshire, England. Like many English clockmakers, he belonged to the Society of Friends, also called Quakers. The earliest known clockmakers in Leek came from the Stretch Quaker family. Samuel Stretch, his uncle, was making lantern clocks in Leek in 1670. Peter Stretch acquired an intimate knowledge of the art from some of the finest clockmakers in England — Thomas Tompion, George Graham, and Daniel Quare.

He married Margery Hall (May 25, 1688 – July 27, 1746) at Chesterfield, Derby, England on May 18, 1693.

== Emigration to America ==
Along with their three sons, Daniel (1694–1735), Thomas (1697–October 17, 1765) and William (1701–1748), and daughter Elizabeth (1699–1759), they emigrated to America in 1703, arriving when Peter Stretch was 32. The Quaker Monthly Meeting at Philadelphia received the family in June 1703.

A daughter, Hannah, died as a child in 1708. Children born in Philadelphia include Sarah (1705–?), Samuel (1706–1762), Hannah (1707–1708) and Joseph (December 20, 1709 – April 3, 1771). Joseph's daughter (Peter Stretch's granddaughter) Sarah (July 13, 1733 – April 19, 1770), married the eminent merchant Samuel Howell (1723–1807), a financier of the American Revolution.

== Clockmaker and real estate investor ==
The first settlers of Philadelphia were mainly artisans, many of them belonging to the English gentry, who had sold their property and come to America to escape religious persecution. This describes Peter Stretch. He soon became an important figure in the social, political and economic life of Philadelphia.

He was one of the earliest clockmakers to settle in the Province of Pennsylvania. The first record of his purchasing land was on July 26, 1707, when he acquired 300 acres in Gloucester County, New Jersey. Records show that Peter Stretch made a number of real estate purchases, some speculative or for investment.

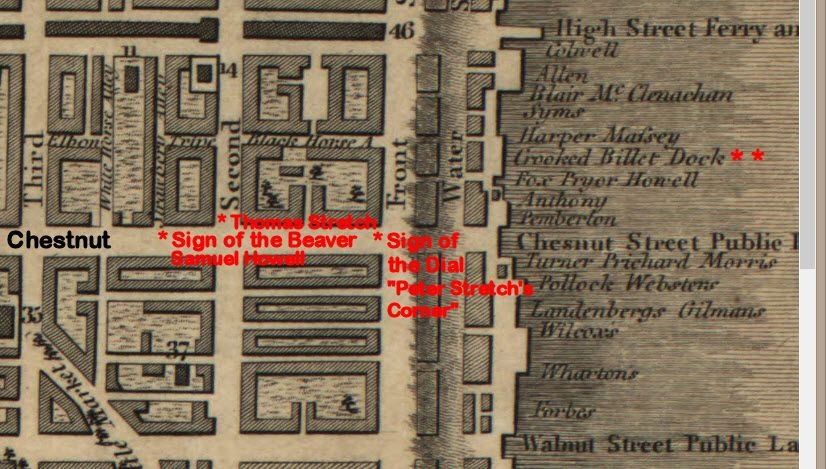
Location of the "Sign of the Dial" at Front and Chestnut Streets, later Second and Chestnut, called Peter Stretch's Corner. In 1719, he purchased a second property, marked here as Thomas Stretch. Upon Peter's death, the properties were inherited by his son, clockmaker Thomas Stretch.

On November 11, 1715, he purchased a property at the southeast corner of Front and Chestnut Streets in Philadelphia, where he set up shop in his home. On March 1, 1719, he purchased another property, located at the southwest corner of Second and Chestnut, where he built a home and set up a shop called "Peter Stretch's Corner at the Sign of the Dial". He resided there until his death.

At the time of his death, his will listed four properties in his possession: the house and lot at Front and Second Streets; the house on the corner of Second and Chestnut Streets (his residence and shop); a lot with two houses facing Morris Alley; and a 400-acre tract in Salem County, New Jersey.

Two of his sons, a nephew and a grandson worked with him. In America, he specialized in long-case clocks, producing dozens of them. (Long-case and tall clock are terms, used interchangeably, for what today are more commonly referred to as "grandfather clocks".) From the first, his clocks showed that they were made to fit into the homes of cultured families with English traditions. He made clocks for many prominent Philadelphia families. He was also commissioned by Philadelphia's Common Council in 1717 to work on the town clock.

== Maker of scientific instruments ==
The earliest mention of a craftsman manufacturing scientific instruments in Philadelphia was of Peter Stretch. In 1733, he provided Thomas Penn, Proprietor of Pennsylvania, with a number of scales and weights, and "two needles for Surveying & a Contor [sic]".

== Public service ==
Stretch served as a member of the Common Council from 1708 until his death in 1746, and was a dominating influence in the community.

Peter and Margery Stretch became role models for Philadelphians. They gave advice to unmarried Quakers about maintaining "moderation or modesty" in budding love affairs. The couple donated money to widows, orphans and victims of house fires and kidnappings by Indians.

== Children ==
His son Thomas was also a man of note, being a clockmaker and the founding Governor of the Schuylkill Fishing Company angling club. Soon after the death of his father, Thomas Stretch sold his father's property at Front and Chestnut streets and established himself a block farther west, at the "Sign of the Dial" at the southwest corner of Second and Chestnut Streets. Another son, William, also became a clockmaker; William received all of his father's tools, imported clocks and unfinished clockworks upon his death.

His oldest son, Daniel, preferred the life of a planter and lived in Salem, New Jersey, where Peter's brother, Joseph, had settled in 1695.

Through his sons, Peter Stretch showed that love of philanthropy so inherent in the Friends of both yesterday and today. Thomas Stretch was one of the founders of Pennsylvania Hospital and a member of the Union Fire Company, also known as Benjamin Franklin's Bucket Brigade. He was a director of the Philadelphia Contributionship (Hand-in-Hand fire mark) from 1758 to 1761.

Joseph, Peter's youngest son, was a hatter by trade and, following his father's example, devoted time to public service. He served as tax collector for Philadelphia County, 1747–1748; collector of excise for the city and county of Philadelphia, 1756–1771; and warden of the city, 1751–1754. Joseph Stretch was a founding member of the Library Company of Philadelphia, which was established through the influence of Benjamin Franklin in 1741. He was for many years a member of the Provincial Assembly, serving in 1756 on the Finance Committee with his friend, "B. Franklin". Joseph Stretch died on April 1, 1771.

== Stretch clocks ==
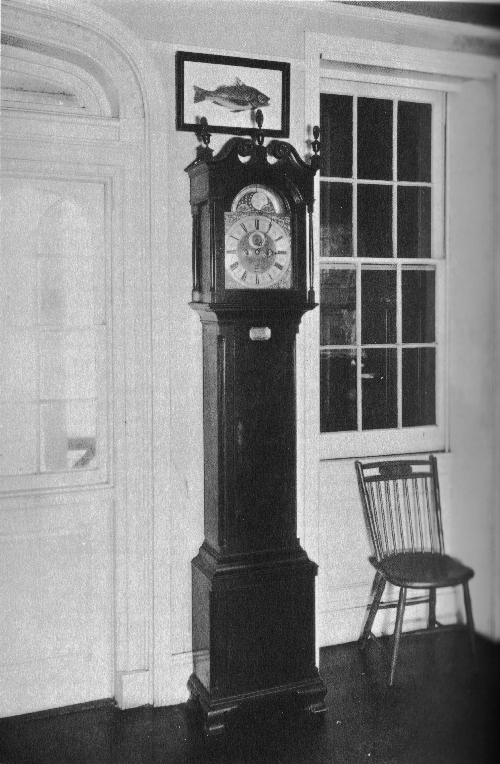
Peter Stretch tallclock, circa 1740, at the State in Schuylkill.

Stretch produced a wide range of clocks, including thirty-hour and eight-day ones with engraved brass movements, plain dials, and single hands and more elaborate ones with a sweep second hand, revolving moon dials, and musical works. By 1710, the Stretch clocks had not only a minute hand, but also a second hand. His earliest clocks were made of solid walnut; his later cases were of mahogany, following closely in design the clocks that were made in England during the William and Mary period.

The most sophisticated Peter Stretch clock found was owned by The State in Schuylkill.

While conducting a study of early clockmakers in Philadelphia, Carolyn Wood Stretch located in the Philadelphia area twenty clocks made by Peter Stretch, seven by Thomas, and two by William. Watches made by Thomas Stretch were also greatly treasured by their owners. That she had not been so successful in locating many of the clocks made by Thomas Stretch is attributed to the fact that they have reached the hands of dealers and been scattered across the country.

At Independence Hall, the second-floor Governor's Council Chamber is furnished with important examples of the era by the National Park Service, including a musical tall case clock made by Peter Stretch circa 1740.

A Queen Anne carved and figured mahogany tall case clock, made by Peter Stretch in Philadelphia circa 1740, was bought at auction by Winterthur Museum and Country Estate on October 28, 2004, for the highest price ever paid for an American clock: $1.7 million.

== Bibliography ==
Fennimore, Donald L. and Hohmann, III, Frank L. "Stretch. America's First Family of Clockmakers." A Winterthur Book. The Henry Francis duPont Winterthur Museum, Inc. and Hohmann Holdings, LLC. 2013.

Frazier, Arthur H. "The Stretch Clock and its Bell at the State House". Pennsylvania Magazine of History and Biography, XCVIII (1974)

Stretch, Carolyn Wood. "Peter Stretch, Clockmaker — 1670-1746". International Studio Magazine. October, 1930. pp 47–49.

Stretch, Carolyn Wood. "Early Colonial Clockmakers in Philadelphia". Pennsylvania Magazine of History and Biography, LVI (1932), p 226.
