= Abraham Markoe =

Danish businessman, landowner and planter (1727–1806)

Abraham Markoe (July 2, 1727 – August 28, 1806) was a Danish businessman, landowner and planter. Living in Pennsylvania during the American Revolution, he actively supported U.S. independence by founding the Philadelphia Light Horse, now known as the First City Troop, and presenting them with a regimental flag of thirteen stripes to represent the thirteen rebel colonies.

== Early life ==
Markoe (Markøe in Danish) was born in St. Croix, in what was then the Danish West Indies. His grandfather, Pierre Marcou, a French Huguenot, had left France for the Danish West Indies before the revocation of the Edict of Nantes. His father was Pierre Markoe, who changed the family name to Markoe, and married Elizabeth Cunningham.

In St. Croix, Markoe became rich by inheriting his father's sugar plantations and trading with both American colonies and Europe. He married a widow, Elizabeth (Kenny) Rogers, in 1751, and had two sons, Peter and Abraham Jr.

== Philadelphia ==
He went to Philadelphia about the year 1770, his wife having died. Abraham Markoe Jr., stayed in St. Croix to manage the family sugar plantations.

He married Elizabeth Baynton in Christ Church in 1773. He had seven children from this marriage.

When there were indications of rebellion, Markoe was the founder and the first Captain of the Philadelphia Light Horse, known today as the First Troop Philadelphia City Cavalry. The unit was composed of rich gentlemen of the city, who paid for their own horses and equipment. When the Continental Congress appointed George Washington the Commander in Chief, and Washington departed for Massachusetts on June 21, 1775, the Philadelphia Light Horse escorted him through New Jersey to New York City. As a Danish subject, Markoe could not actually fight in the war because of the King of Denmark's Neutrality Edict, but he did contribute to the American war effort in many other ways. One early contribution was a regimental flag with thirteen stripes representing the thirteen colonies that were striving to become the original thirteen states.

== See also ==
- Margaret Hartman Markoe Bache, a publisher and member of the Markoe family, also from Saint Croix.
