= First Troop Philadelphia City Cavalry =

Unit of the Pennsylvania Army National Guard

Coordinates: 39.953246°N 75.178415°W

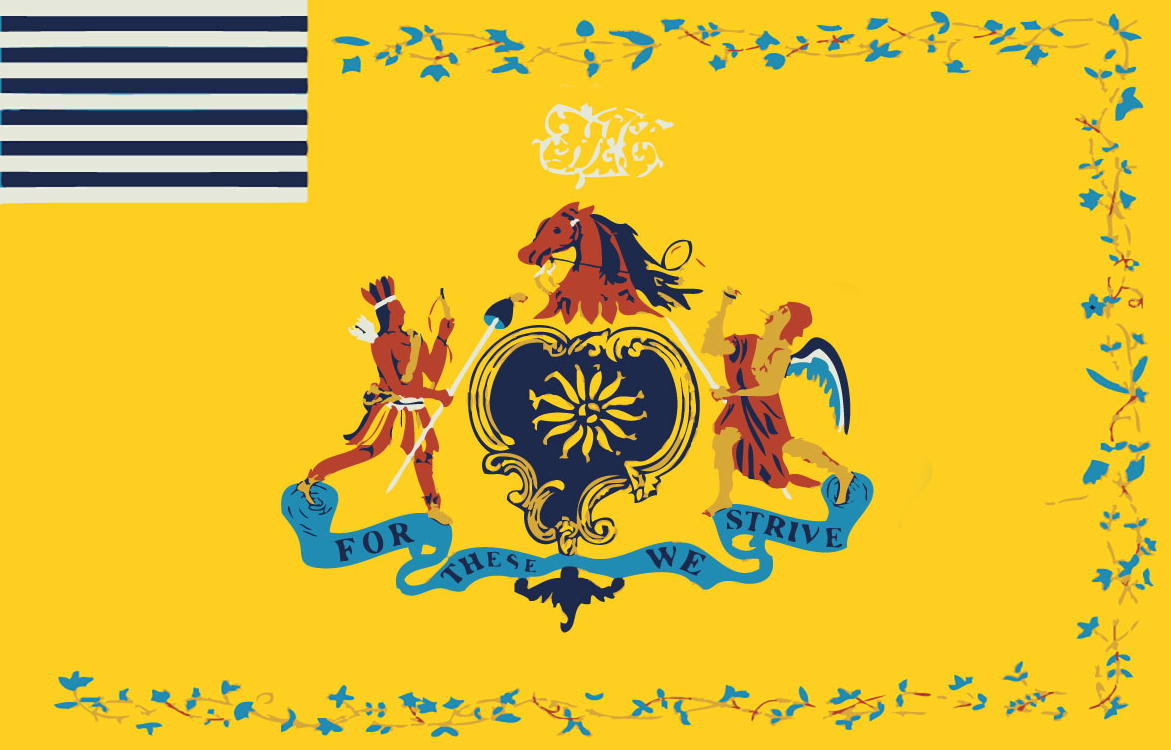
- Flag of the First Troop Philadelphia City Cavalry
- Founded: November 17, 1774
- Country: United States
- Branch: Pennsylvania Militia; Pennsylvania Army National Guard
- Type: Light cavalry
- Size: 64 (2025)
- Garrison/HQ: 23rd Street Armory, Philadelphia, Pennsylvania
- Nicknames: First City Troop; The Troop
- Motto: "For These We Strive"
- Anniversaries: Unit founding: November 17
- Website: firsttroop.com

Commanders
- Current commander: CPT Colin Yabor
- Notable commanders: CPT Abraham Markoe

The First Troop Philadelphia City Cavalry, also known as the First City Troop, is a troop-sized unit of the Pennsylvania Army National Guard. One of the oldest American military units still in active service, the troop is also one of the United States Army's most decorated units. The troop operates under a number of principles of self-governance unique in the U.S. military, including the election of unit members, the intentional foregoing of pay, the practice of equestrianism, and recruiting from veterans who saw active service and civilians. The First Troop Philadelphia City Cavalry is the only U.S. military unit that owns its own armory building, built with private funds in Philadelphia's Rittenhouse Square neighborhood. As of November 2017, the troop had 46 active members, up from 35 in 2014.

== History ==
A Philadelphia Light Horse private (second from right) in 1774–1775

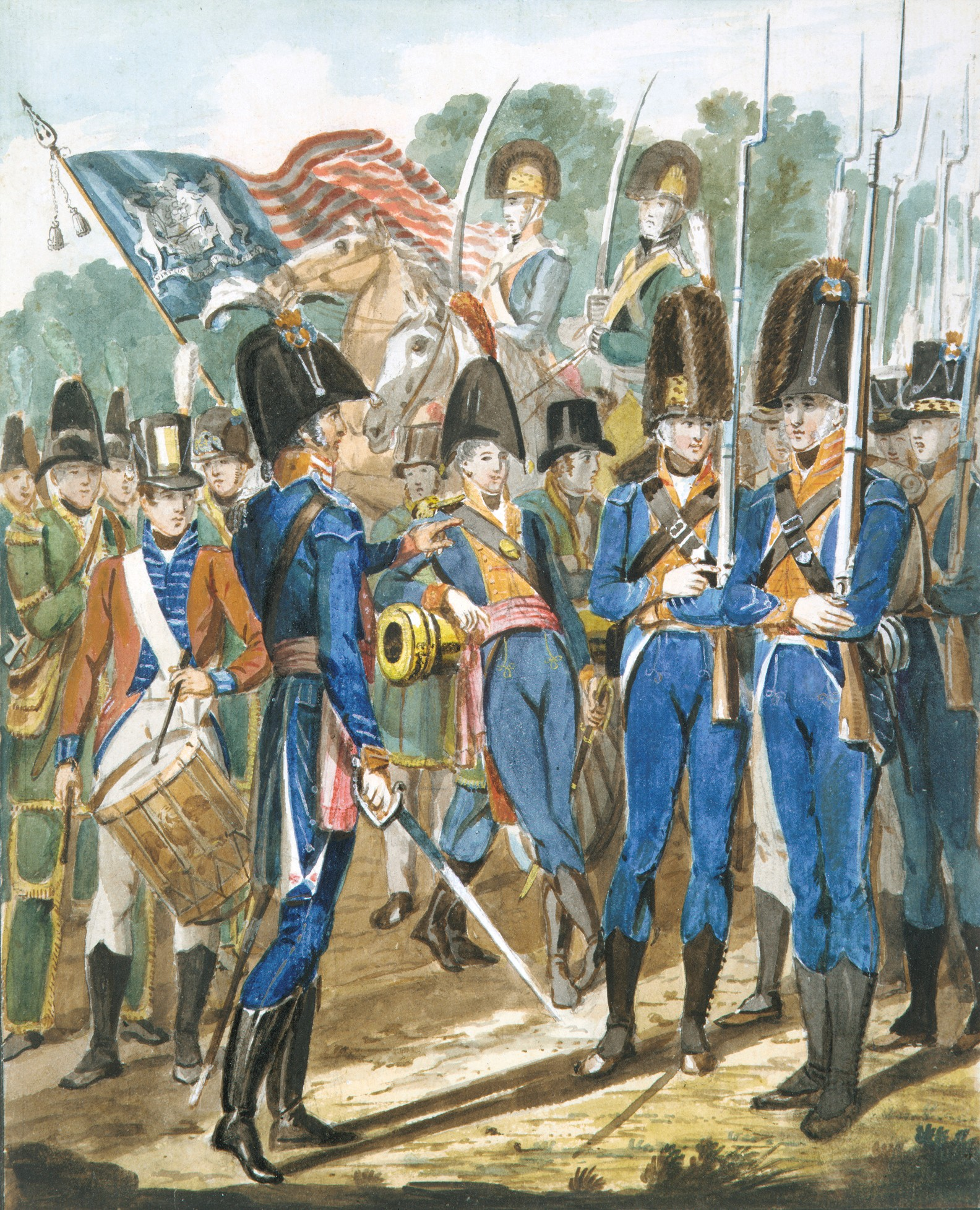
1811–1813 illustration of the Philadelphia Light Horse (background)

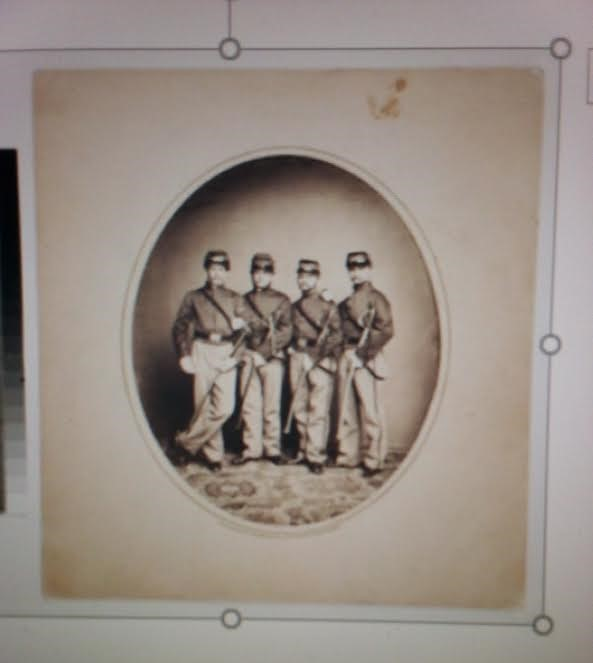
First Troop Philadelphia City Cavalry corporals in 1861

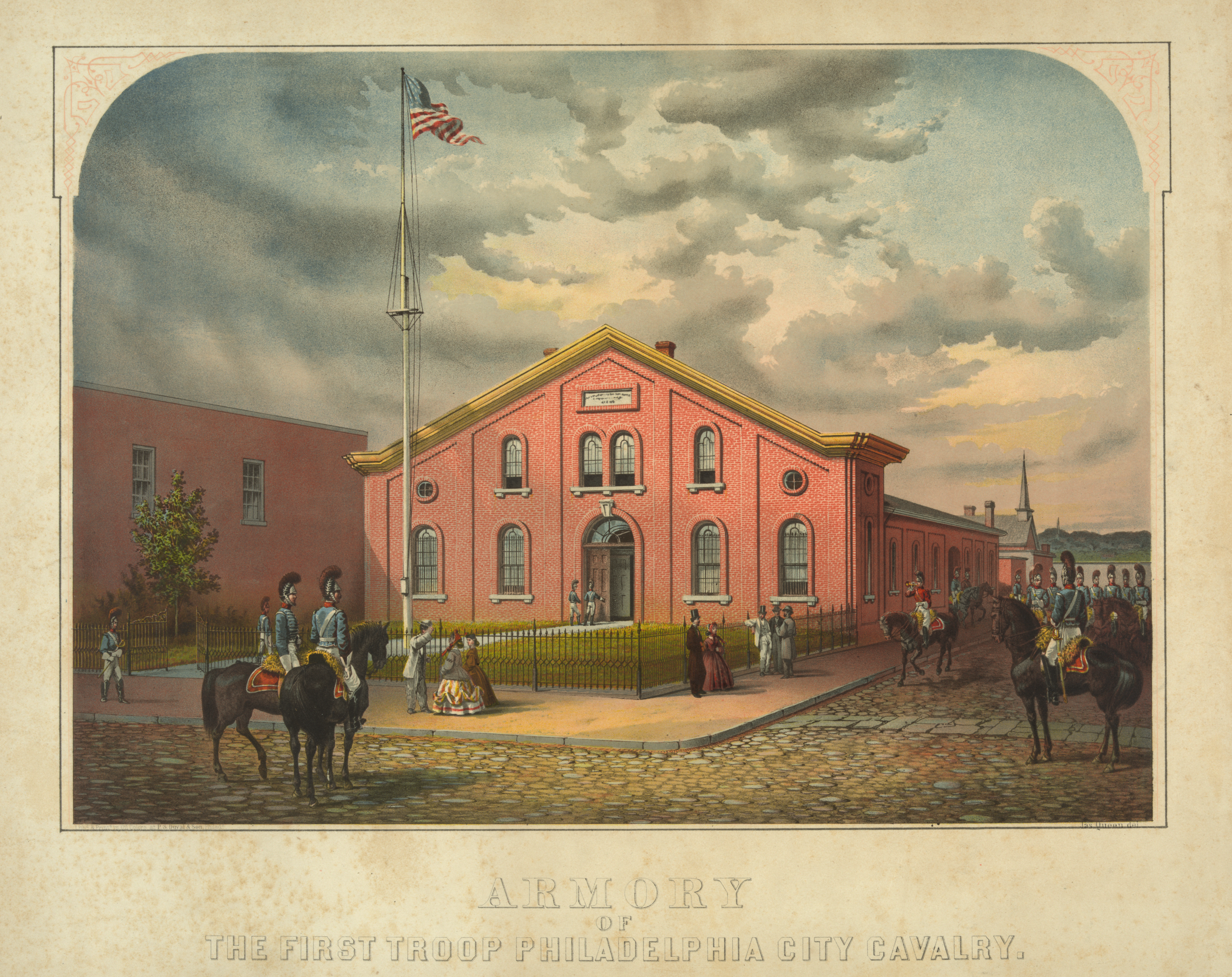
The First Troop Philadelphia City Cavalry's armory in 1863

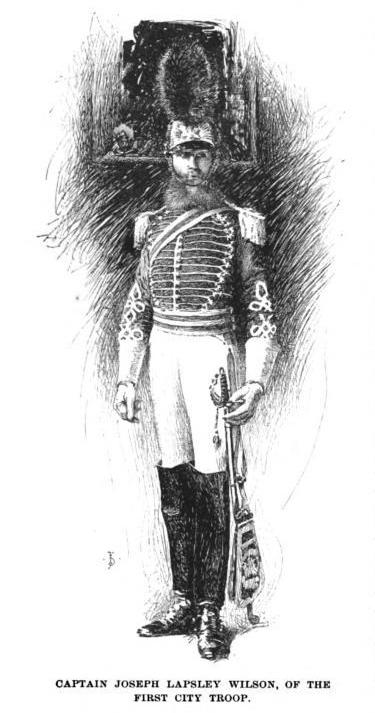
Captain Joseph Lapsley Wilson of the First Troop Philadelphia City Cavalry in c. 1894

The First Troop Philadelphia City Cavalry, or "First City Troop", was raised by the Pennsylvania Militia in 1774 as the Light Horse of the City of Philadelphia, often referred to as the Philadelphia Light Horse, one of the first Patriot military units raised as part of the American Revolution. Abraham Markoe was the founder and the first captain of the Philadelphia Light Horse, known today as the First Troop Philadelphia City Cavalry.

Early members came from a number of local social organizations, including the Schuylkill Fishing Company, the Schuylkill Company of Fort St. Davids, the St. Andrew's Society of Philadelphia, the Society of the Friendly Sons of St. Patrick, the Society of the Sons of St. George, and especially the Gloucester Fox Hunting Club. Captain Samuel Morris was Gloucester's first president and Captain Robert Wharton its last.

During the Revolution, the troop fought in the battles of Trenton, Princeton, Brandywine, and Germantown. It often served as George Washington's personal bodyguard. The unit also saved James Wilson at the "Battle of Fort Wilson" riot.

During the American Civil War, the First City Troop was called into active duty several times, beginning with the 1861 Campaign that led to the First Battle of Bull Run. During the Gettysburg campaign, the company, under the command of future U.S. Speaker of the House Samuel J. Randall, performed scouting duties leading into the Battle of Gettysburg, Pennsylvania, in late June before being redeployed to York County following a brief skirmish on June 26, 1863. The company later screened Columbia-Wrightsville Bridge against the Confederate forces of John Brown Gordon.

John J. Pershing said that "no National Guard organization in the country did more, relatively, in the First World War than" the First City Troop.

Today, the First City Troop deploys overseas with the Pennsylvania National Guard in support of Army operations. Since 9/11, the unit has deployed to Bosnia, Iraq, Egypt, and Kuwait. Elements of the unit have also deployed to Afghanistan, the Persian Gulf, Europe, and Latin America. Membership is by election. Soldiers on the active roll continue to donate their drill pay back to the unit, in order to maintain a tradition of voluntary service.

The troop draws its membership from Troop A, 1st Squadron, 104th Cavalry Regiment, 28th Infantry Division (United States), Pennsylvania Army National Guard.

== Campaign credit ==
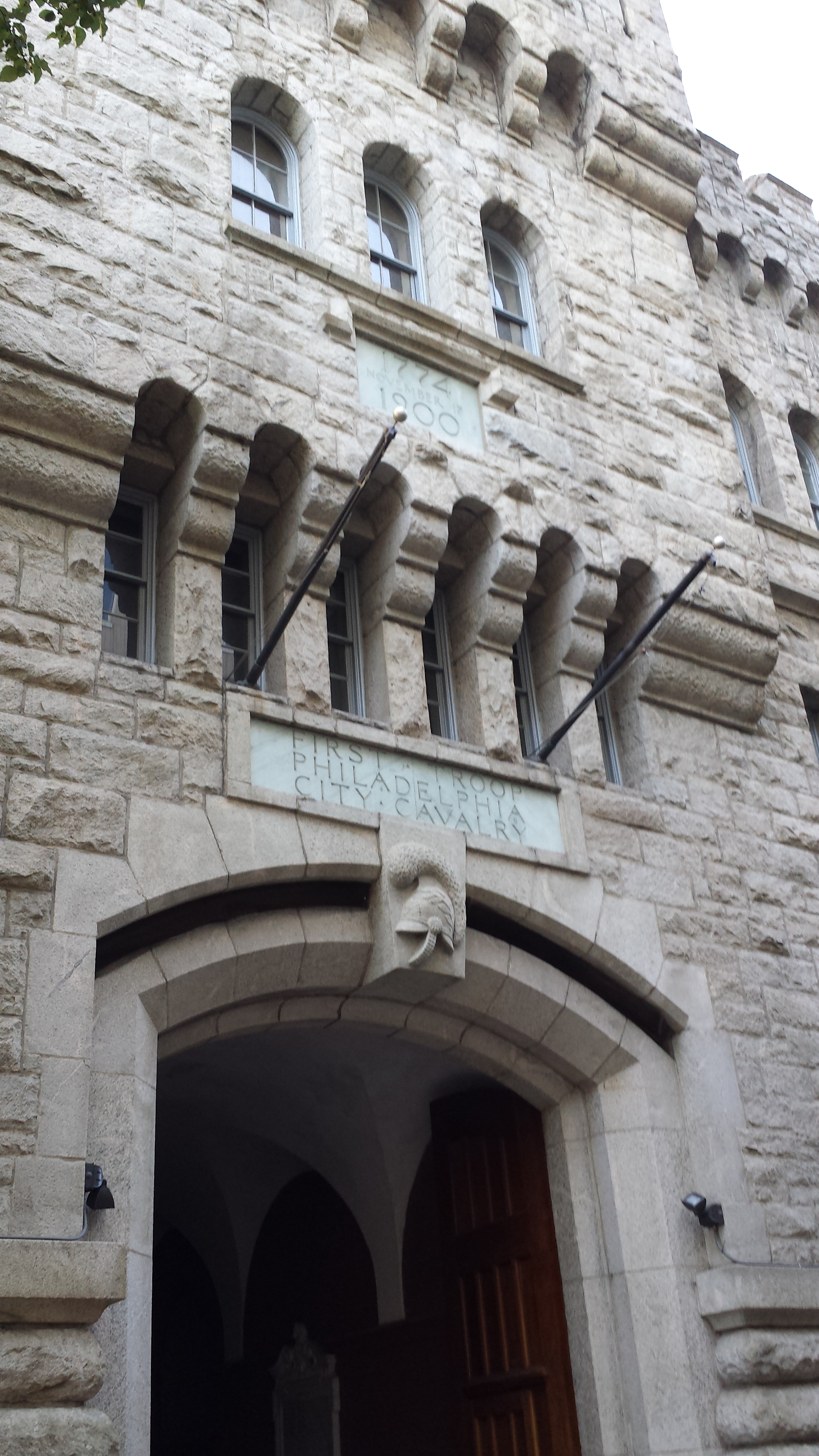
Facade of the First Troop armory

Revolutionary War

- Battle of Trenton
- Battle of Princeton
- Battle of Brandywine
- Battle of Germantown
- New Jersey 1776
- New Jersey 1777
- Pennsylvania 1777

Civil War

- Peninsula Campaign
- First Battle of Bull Run
- Battle of Antietam
- Battle of Fredericksburg
- Battle of Gettysburg
- Battle of the Wilderness
- Battle of Spotsylvania
- Battle of Cold Harbor
- Siege of Petersburg
- Shenandoah
- Battle of Appomattox
- Virginia 1861
- Virginia 1862
- Virginia 1863
- Virginia 1864
- Maryland 1863
- Pennsylvania 1863

War with Spain

- Puerto Rico

World War I

- Battle of Ypres-Lys
- Champagne-Marne
- Aisne-Marne
- Oise-Aisne
- Meuse-Argonne
- Champagne 1918
- Lorraine 1918

World War II

- Northern France
- Central Europe

Operation Enduring Freedom

- Global War on Terrorism Expeditionary Streamer

== Captains of the Troop ==
- Abraham Markoe (1774-1776)
- Samuel Morris (1776-1786)
- Samuel Miles (1786-1788)
- Christian Febiger (1790-1794)
- John Dunlap (1794-1803)
- Robert Wharton (1803-1810)
- Charles Ross (1811-1817)
- John R. C. Smith (1817-1825)
- Lynford Lardner (1825-1827)
- William H. Hart (1827-1842)
- John Butler (1842-1847)
- Thomas C. James (1850-1863)
- Fairman Rogers (1866-1869)
- M. Edward Rogers (1869-1876)
- A. Loudon Snowden (1877-1878)
- Edward Burd Grubb (1878-1889)
- Jos. Lapsley Wilson (1889-1894)
- John C. Groome (1896-1910)
- J. Franklin McFadden (1910-1917)
- George C. Thayer (1917-1919)
- Thomas Cadwalader (1919-1920)
- Clement B. Wood (1920-1930)
- Effingham B. Morris Jr. (1930-1933)
- Crawford C. Madera (1933-1937)
- John C. Groome Jr. (1937-1941)
- Henry B. Coxe Jr. (1941-1942)
- Robert N. Downs III (1942-1946)
- R. Gwynne Stout (1946-1948)
- Robert S. Ingersoll Jr. (1948-1950)
- William S. Stokes Jr. (1950-1957)
- Henry P, Glendinning Jr. (1957-1960)
- Henry Mck. Ingersoll (1960-1965)
- Thomas G. Ashton (1965-1966)
- Charles M. Meredith III (1966-1968)
- G. Jeremy Cummin (1968-1970)
- Murray H. Dawson (1970-1975)
- Stanley Bright III (1975-1978)
- Alexander Kerr (1978-1980)
- Marcel Francois Lamour (1980-1983)
- Dennis Joseph Boylan (1983-1988)
- Simeon D. Isayeff (1988-1989)
- Richard D. Hughes (1989-1991)
- Keith D. Roger (1991- 1995)
- Christopher C. Smythe (1995-1997)
- Harry J. Gobora III (1997-2000)
- Eric E.L. Guenther Jr. (2000-2003)
- Lawrence J. Field (2003-2007)
- Anslem T.W. Richards (2007-2009)
- David B Thayer (2009-2010)
- Tyler C. Hathaway (2010-2014)
- Garri B. Hendell (2014-2016)
- Gregory T. Colella (2016-2020)
- Jason P. Wall (2020-2022)
- Michael L. Easterly (2022-2024)
- Timothy C. Lehotsky (2024-2025)
- Colin Yabor (2025-Present)

== See also ==
- First Troop Philadelphia City Cavalry Armory
- City guard
