= National Register of Historic Places listings in Southwest Philadelphia =

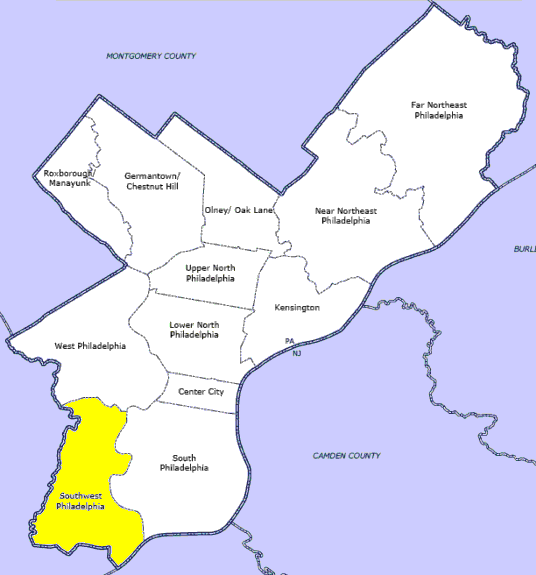
Location of Southwest Philadelphia in Philadelphia

This is a list of the National Register of Historic Places listings in Southwest Philadelphia.

This is intended to be a complete list of the properties and districts on the National Register of Historic Places in Southwest Philadelphia, Pennsylvania, United States. The locations of National Register properties and districts for which the latitude and longitude coordinates are included below may be seen in a Google map.

There are 562 properties and districts listed on the National Register in Philadelphia, including 67 National Historic Landmarks. Southwest Philadelphia includes 12 of these properties and districts, including 2 National Historic Landmarks; the city's remaining properties and districts are listed elsewhere.

== Current listings ==
| | Name on the Register | Image | Date listed | Location | Neighborhood | Description |
|---|---|---|---|---|---|---|
| 1 | John Bartram High School | John Bartram High School | December 4, 1986 (#86003263) | 67th and Elmwood Streets; 39°55′16″N 75°13′58″W | Middle Southwest | |
| 2 | John Bartram House | John Bartram House | October 15, 1966 (#66000676) | 54th Street and Eastwick Avenue; 39°55′54″N 75°12′43″W | Bartram Village | |
| 3 | Joseph W. Catharine School | Joseph W. Catharine School | November 18, 1988 (#88002253) | 6600 Chester Avenue; 39°55′39″N 75°14′23″W | Mount Moriah | |
| 4 | Fort Mifflin | Fort Mifflin | August 29, 1970 (#70000554) | Fort Mifflin and Hog Island Roads; 39°52′31″N 75°12′47″W | Philadelphia International Airport | |
| 5 | Fort Mifflin Hospital | Fort Mifflin Hospital | September 29, 1969 (#69000157) | Fort Mifflin and Hog Island Road; 39°52′35″N 75°12′41″W | Philadelphia International Airport | |
| 6 | S. Weir Mitchell School | S. Weir Mitchell School | December 4, 1986 (#86003309) | 56th and Kingsessing Street; 39°56′12″N 75°13′25″W | Kingsessing | |
| 7 | John M. Patterson School | John M. Patterson School | November 18, 1988 (#88002305) | 7001 Buist Avenue; 39°54′58″N 75°14′12″W | Penrose | |
| 8 | Thomas Buchanan Read School | Thomas Buchanan Read School | December 4, 1986 (#86003325) | 78th Street and Buist Avenue; 39°54′23″N 75°14′52″W | Elmwood Park | |
| 9 | Regent-Rennoc Court | Regent-Rennoc Court | September 12, 1985 (#85002292) | 5100 block of Regent Street and 1319 South 52nd Street; 39°56′29″N 75°13′09″W | Southwest Schuylkill | |
| 10 | Anna Howard Shaw Junior High School | Anna Howard Shaw Junior High School | November 18, 1988 (#88002321) | 5401 Warrington Street; 39°56′30″N 75°13′35″W | Southwest Schuylkill | |
| 11 | William J. Tilden Junior High School | William J. Tilden Junior High School | December 1, 1986 (#86003337) | 66th Street and Elmwood Avenue; 39°55′18″N 75°13′56″W | Paschall | |
| 12 | George Wolf School | George Wolf School | November 18, 1988 (#88002243) | 8100 Lyons Avenue; 39°53′55″N 75°14′46″W | Hedgerow | |

== See also ==
- List of National Historic Landmarks in Philadelphia
- National Register of Historic Places listings in Philadelphia, Pennsylvania
