= List of National Historic Landmarks in Philadelphia =

There are 67 National Historic Landmarks within Philadelphia, Pennsylvania. See also the List of National Historic Landmarks in Pennsylvania, which covers the 102 landmarks in the rest of the state.

== Key ==
	National Historic Landmark
^{†}	National Historic Landmark District
^{#}	National Historic Site, National Historical Park, National Memorial, or National Monument
^{*}	Delisted Landmark

== Current listings ==
	Landmark name	Image	Date designated	Location	Neighborhood	Description
1	Academy of Music	Academy of Music	December 29, 1962 (#66000674)	Center City Broad & Locust Sts. 39°56′53″N 75°09′54″W	Rittenhouse Square West	Former longtime home of the Philadelphia Orchestra and current home of the Pennsylvania Ballet and the Opera Company of Philadelphia. The oldest opera house in the United States that is still used for its original purpose.
2	American Philosophical Society Hall	American Philosophical Society Hall	January 12, 1965 (#66000675)	Center City 104 S. 5th St. Independence Square; 39°56′56″N 75°08′59″W	Independence Mall	Society founded 1743 by Benjamin Franklin. Building erected 1768. Early members included George Washington, John Adams, and Thomas Jefferson.
3	Arch Street Friends Meeting House	Arch Street Friends Meeting House	June 23, 2011 (#71000716)	Center City; 302–338 Arch Street; 39°57′07″N 75°08′50″W	Independence Mall	Built by noted Federal period architect Owen Biddle. In continuous use since 1805. The largest Quaker meeting house in the country.
4	Athenaeum	Athenaeum	December 8, 1976 (#72001144)	Center City 219 S. 6th St. 39°56′48″N 75°09′06″W	Washington Square East	A special collections library founded in 1814. The building was designed in 1845 by John Notman.
5	John Bartram House	John Bartram House	October 9, 1960 (#66000676)	Southwest Philadelphia 54th St. & Lindbergh Blvd. 39°55′54″N 75°12′43″W	Bartram Village	Home of colonial-era botanist John Bartram and son William Bartram, and the oldest surviving botanic garden in North America.
6	Boathouse Row	Boathouse Row	February 27, 1987 (#87000821)	North Philadelphia 1–15 Kelly Drive; 39°58′14″N 75°11′14″W	Fairmount	A row of fifteen historic boathouses along the Schuylkill River. The Schuylkill Navy is based here. Architect Frank Furness and the Undine Barge Club have association with this site.
7	Carpenters' Hall	Carpenters' Hall	April 15, 1970 (#70000552)	Center City 320 Chestnut St. 39°56′53″N 75°08′50″W	Independence Mall	The First Continental Congress met here.
8	Christ Church	Christ Church	April 15, 1970 (#70000553)	Center City 2nd St., between Market & Filbert Sts. 39°57′03″N 75°08′37″W	Old City	Founded 1695. First Episcopal Church in the country. Built 1727–1744.
9	Church of the Advocate	Church of the Advocate	June 19, 1996 (#80003620)	North Philadelphia 18th & Diamond Sts. 39°59′09″N 75°09′49″W	North Philadelphia	Built 1887–1897. The site in 1974 of the first ordinations of women as priests in the Episcopal Church.
10	Cliveden	Cliveden	January 20, 1961 (#66000677)	Northwest Philadelphia 6401 Germantown Ave. 40°02′50″N 75°10′54″W	Mt. Airy	The scene of fighting at the Battle of Germantown.
11	The College of Physicians of Philadelphia Building	The College of Physicians of Philadelphia Building	October 6, 2008 (#08001088)	Center City 19 South 22nd St. 39°57′12″N 75°10′36″W	Rittenhouse Square West	
12^{†}	Colonial Germantown Historic District	Colonial Germantown Historic District	June 23, 1965 (#66000678)	Northwest Philadelphia Germantown Ave., between Windrim Ave. & Upsal St. 40°02′11″N 75°10′29″W	Mt. Airy and Germantown	Associated with William Penn.
13	John Coltrane House	John Coltrane House	January 20, 1999 (#99000628)	North Philadelphia 1511 North 33rd St. 39°58′49″N 75°11′21″W	Strawberry Mansion	A home of jazz saxophonist John Coltrane.
14	Edward D. Cope House	Edward D. Cope House	May 15, 1975 (#75001660)	Center City 2102 Pine St. 39°56′49″N 75°10′36″W	Rittenhouse Square West	A home of paleontologist Edward Drinker Cope, who is listed in National Academy of Sciences.
15	Thomas Eakins House	Thomas Eakins House	December 21, 1965 (#66000679)	North Philadelphia 1729 Mount Vernon Pl. 39°57′56″N 75°10′02″W	Spring Garden	Home of painter Thomas Eakins.
16	Eastern State Penitentiary	Eastern State Penitentiary	June 23, 1965 (#66000680)	North Philadelphia 21st St. & Fairmount Ave. 39°58′05″N 75°10′23″W	Fairmount	Considered to be the world's first true penitentiary, designed by John Haviland.
17^{†}	Elfreth's Alley Historic District	Elfreth's Alley Historic District	October 9, 1960 (#66000681)	Center City Between 2nd & Front Sts. 39°57′10″N 75°08′33″W	Old City	The country's oldest residential neighborhood in continuous use.
18	Fairmount Water Works	Fairmount Water Works	May 11, 1976 (#76001662)	North Philadelphia Eastern banks of the Schuylkill River; 39°57′59″N 75°11′09″W	Fairmount Park	First municipal waterworks in the United States. Designed in 1812 by Frederick Graff and built between 1819 and 1822, it operated until 1909.
19	First Bank of the United States	First Bank of the United States	May 4, 1987 (#87001292)	Center City 116 S. Third St. 39°56′53″N 75°08′47″W	Independence Mall	Has association with Washington and Alexander Hamilton.
20	Fort Mifflin	Fort Mifflin	August 29, 1970 (#70000554)	Southwest Philadelphia Marina & Penrose Ferry Rds. 39°52′31″N 75°12′47″W	Philadelphia International Airport	Revolutionary War-era fort on the Delaware River.
21	Founder's Hall, Girard College	Founder's Hall, Girard College	August 4, 1969 (#69000158)	North Philadelphia Corinthian & Girard Aves. 39°58′26″N 75°10′12″W	Girard College	Boarding school (K-12) for orphans established by the will of Stephen Girard.
22^{†}	Friends Hospital	Friends Hospital	January 20, 1999 (#99000629)	Northeast Philadelphia 4641 Roosevelt Blvd. 40°01′36″N 75°06′07″W	Northwood	The first private psychiatric hospital in the U.S., founded in 1813 by the Quakers. Designed and/or influenced by William Tuke, York Retreat, and Thomas Scattergood.
23	Furness Library, School of Fine Arts, University of Pennsylvania	Furness Library, School of Fine Arts, University of Pennsylvania	February 4, 1985 (#72001154)	West Philadelphia 34th St. below Walnut St. 39°57′06″N 75°11′34″W	University City	Library at the University of Pennsylvania, designed by Frank Furness.
24	Germantown (Manheim) Cricket Club	Germantown (Manheim) Cricket Club	February 27, 1987 (#87000758)	Northwest Philadelphia 5140 Morris St. 40°01′25″N 75°10′24″W	Germantown	Bill Tilden was a member.
25	Frances Ellen Watkins Harper House	Frances Ellen Watkins Harper House	December 8, 1976 (#76001663)	South Philadelphia 1006 Bainbridge St. 39°56′31″N 75°09′34″W	Bella Vista	A home of Frances Harper
26	Hill-Keith-Physick House	Hill-Keith-Physick House	January 7, 1976 (#71000726)	Center City 321 S. Fourth St. 39°56′40″N 75°08′54″W	Society Hill	A home of Philip Syng Physick, "father of American surgery".
27	Institute of the Pennsylvania Hospital	Institute of the Pennsylvania Hospital	June 23, 1965 (#66000684)	West Philadelphia 49th & Market Sts. 39°57′42″N 75°13′02″W	Mill Creek	Men's hospital built 1856–59. Plan influenced by Thomas Story Kirkbride.
28	Insurance Company of North America (INA) Building	Insurance Company of North America (INA) Building	June 2, 1978 (#78002449)	Center City 1600 Arch St. 39°57′16″N 75°10′02″W	Logan Square	
29	Johnson House	Johnson House	December 9, 1997 (#72001162)	Northwest Philadelphia 6306 Germantown Ave. 40°02′36″N 75°10′52″W	Germantown	Underground Railroad station house within the Colonial Germantown Historic District.
30	Laurel Hill Cemetery	Laurel Hill Cemetery	August 5, 1998 (#77001185)	North Philadelphia 3822 Ridge Ave. 40°00′15″N 75°11′19″W	Fairmount Park	One of the first rural cemeteries, designed by John Notman.
31	J. Peter Lesley House	J. Peter Lesley House	October 12, 1994 (#94001646)	Center City 1008 Clinton St. 39°56′43″N 75°09′31″W	Washington Square West	A home of geologist J. Peter Lesley.
32	Memorial Hall	Memorial Hall	December 8, 1976 (#76001665)	West Philadelphia North Concourse Drive; 39°58′46″N 75°12′35″W	Fairmount Park	Designed by Herman Schwartzmann for the 1876 Centennial Exposition.
33	Merchants' Exchange Building	Merchants' Exchange Building	August 7, 2001 (#01001047)	Center City 143 S. Third St. 39°56′50″N 75°08′46″W	Independence Mall	Designed by William Strickland; part of Independence National Historical Park
34	Mother Bethel A.M.E. Church	Mother Bethel A.M.E. Church	May 30, 1974 (#72001166)	Center City 419 Richard Allen Ave. (South 6th St.); 39°56′35″N 75°09′09″W	Society Hill	African Methodist Episcopal church on Underground Railroad that was visited by Frederick Douglass, Lucretia Mott, Rosa Parks, and Colin Powell.
35	Mount Pleasant	Mount Pleasant	May 30, 1974 (#66000685)	North Philadelphia East Reservoir Drive; 39°59′00″N 75°12′00″W	Fairmount Park	
36	New Century Guild	New Century Guild	November 4, 1993 (#93001611)	Center City 1307 Locust St. 39°56′53″N 75°09′46″W	Washington Square West	
37	New Market	New Market	November 13, 1966 (#66000686)	Center City S. 2nd St., between Pine & Lombard Sts. 39°56′35″N 75°08′43″W	Society Hill	
38	Charles Willson Peale House	Charles Willson Peale House	December 21, 1965 (#66000687)	North Philadelphia 2100 Clarkson Ave. 40°02′17″N 75°09′20″W	Logan	A home of Charles Willson Peale who painted George Washington. Peale's sons Raphael, Rembrandt and Reubens Peale also became artists and have association with this site.
39	Pennsylvania Academy of the Fine Arts	Pennsylvania Academy of the Fine Arts	May 15, 1975 (#71000731)	Center City Broad & Cherry Sts. 39°57′19″N 75°09′48″W	Hahnemann	
40	Pennsylvania Hospital	Pennsylvania Hospital	June 22, 1965 (#66000688)	Center City 8th & Spruce Sts. 39°56′41″N 75°09′21″W	Washington Square West	Dr. Thomas Bond and Benjamin Franklin supported its development.
41	Philadelphia City Hall	Philadelphia City Hall	December 8, 1976 (#76001666)	Center City Penn Square, at Broad & Market Sts. 39°57′08″N 75°09′49″W	Market East	Designed by John McArthur Jr.; decorated by Alexander Milne Calder, including sculpture of William Penn on top.
42	Philadelphia Contributionship	Philadelphia Contributionship	December 22, 1977 (#71000732)	Center City 212 S. 4th St. 39°56′49″N 75°08′54″W	Society Hill	The oldest property insurance company in the United States, founded in 1752 by Benjamin Franklin. Built 1836.
43	Philadelphia's Masonic Temple	Philadelphia's Masonic Temple	February 4, 1985 (#71000727)	Center City 1 N. Broad St. 39°57′13″N 75°09′46″W	Market East	
44	Philadelphia Savings Fund Society (PSFS) Building	Philadelphia Savings Fund Society (PSFS) Building	December 8, 1976 (#76001667)	Center City 12 S. 12th St. 39°57′06″N 75°09′38″W	Market East	Designed by George Howe and William Lescaze.
45	Philadelphia School of Design for Women	Philadelphia School of Design for Women	November 4, 1993 (#93001608)	North Philadelphia 1346 North Broad St. 39°58′28″N 75°09′33″W	Cabot	Edwin Forrest House, first home of the Philadelphia School of Design for Women, founded in 1848 by Sarah Peter, the only women's art and design college in the nation.
46	Edgar Allan Poe House	Edgar Allan Poe House	December 29, 1962 (#66000689)	North Philadelphia 532 N. 7th St. 39°57′43″N 75°08′59″W	Callowhill	A home of Edgar Allan Poe.
47	Race Street Meetinghouse	Race Street Meetinghouse	November 4, 1993 (#93001610)	Center City 1515 Cherry St. 39°57′21″N 75°09′55″W	Hahnemann	Hicksites were here. Hannah Clothier Hull, Lucretia Mott, and Alice Paul have some association here.
48	Reading Terminal and Trainshed	Reading Terminal and Trainshed	December 8, 1976 (#72001170)	Center City 1115–1141 Market St. 39°57′08″N 75°09′33″W	Philadelphia	Historic train depot, passenger station, and company headquarters of the Reading Railroad.
49	Reynolds-Morris House	Reynolds-Morris House	December 24, 1967 (#67000020)	Center City 225 South Eighth St. 39°56′51″N 75°09′16″W	Society Hill	
50	Alfred Newton Richards Medical Research Laboratories and David Goddard Laboratories Buildings	Alfred Newton Richards Medical Research Laboratories and David Goddard Laboratories Buildings	January 16, 2009 (#09000081)	West Philadelphia 3700–3710 Hamilton Walk; 39°56′59″N 75°11′53″W	University City	Two connected buildings on the University of Pennsylvania that were designed by Louis Kahn and built in the 1960s
51^{†}	Rittenhousetown Historic District	Rittenhousetown Historic District	April 27, 1992 (#92001878)	Northwest Philadelphia 206–210 Lincoln Drive; 40°01′43″N 75°11′28″W	Fairmount Park	Site of British North America's first paper mill. The mill was built in Germantown by William Rittenhouse and his son Nicholas in 1690. Six of the mill town's forty-plus buildings stand today. They include the 1707 Homestead which was the 1732 birthplace of David Rittenhouse.
52	St. James-the-Less Episcopal Church	St. James-the-Less Episcopal Church	February 4, 1985 (#74001801)	North Philadelphia Hunting Park Ave. at Clearfield St. 40°00′13″N 75°10′57″W	Allegheny West	Gothic church of important design influence
53	St. Mark's Episcopal Church	St. Mark's Episcopal Church	February 4, 1985 (#82003815)	Center City 1625 Locust St. 39°56′56″N 75°10′07″W	Rittenhouse Square East	Designed by John Notman.
54	St. Peter's Church	St. Peter's Church	June 18, 1996 (#96000969)	Center City Third & Pine Sts. 39°56′35″N 75°08′52″W	Society Hill	Designed and/or built by Robert Smith.
55	Second Bank of the United States	Second Bank of the United States	May 4, 1987 (#87001293)	Center City 420 Chestnut St. 39°56′55″N 75°08′54″W	Independence Mall	Designed by William Strickland. Associated with Nicholas Biddle and Andrew Jackson.
56	Stenton (James Logan House)	Stenton (James Logan House)	January 12, 1965 (#66000690)	North Philadelphia 18th & Cortland Sts. 40°01′29″N 75°09′13″W	Logan	The colonial-era home of James Logan.
57	Thomas Sully Residence	Thomas Sully Residence	December 21, 1965 (#66000691)	Center City 530 Spruce St. 39°56′42″N 75°09′05″W	Society Hill	Home of Thomas Sully.
58	Henry O. Tanner Homesite	Henry O. Tanner Homesite	May 11, 1976 (#76001672)	North Philadelphia 2908 West Diamond St. 39°59′16″N 75°10′52″W	Strawberry Mansion	A home of Henry Ossawa Tanner
59	United States Naval Asylum	United States Naval Asylum	January 7, 1976 (#72001173)	South Philadelphia Gray's Ferry Ave. at 24th St. 39°56′38″N 75°11′01″W	Southwest Center City	Designed by William Strickland.
60	USS BECUNA	USS BECUNA	January 14, 1986 (#78002458)	Center City Penn's Landing, Delaware Ave. & Spruce St. 39°56′36″N 75°08′28″W	Penn's Landing	A Balao-class submarine that fought in World War II.
61	USS OLYMPIA	USS OLYMPIA	January 29, 1964 (#66000692)	Center City Penn's Landing, Pier 40, at the foot of Chestnut St. 39°56′36″N 75°08′27″W	Penn's Landing	A naval cruiser that served as Commodore George Dewey's flagship in the Battle of Manila Bay in 1898, during the Spanish–American War.
62	Wagner Free Institute of Science	Wagner Free Institute of Science	December 14, 1990 (#89000361)	North Philadelphia 17th St. & Montgomery Ave. 39°58′50″N 75°09′46″W	North Central	Founded by William Wagner. Dr. Joseph Leidy has some association, also.
63	Walnut Street Theatre	Walnut Street Theatre	December 29, 1962 (#66000693)	Center City 9th & Walnut Sts. 39°56′54″N 75°09′20″W	Washington Square West	The oldest continuously operating theatre in the English-speaking world and the oldest in the United States. Maude Adams, Sarah Bernhardt, John Drew, Sir Henry Irving, Richard Mansfield, and Ellen Terry performed here.
64	John Wanamaker Store	John Wanamaker Store	June 2, 1978 (#78002459)	Center City Juniper & Market Sts. 39°57′07″N 75°09′44″W	Market East	One of the first department stores in the United States.
65	Woodford	Woodford	December 24, 1967 (#67000021)	North Philadelphia E. Fairmount Park; 39°59′33″N 75°11′18″W	Fairmount Park	A home of William Coleman.
66^{†}	The Woodlands	The Woodlands	December 24, 1967 (#67000022)	West Philadelphia 4000 Woodland Ave. 39°56′50″N 75°12′10″W	University City	Colonial mansion and later a rural cemetery.
67	Wyck	Wyck	December 14, 1990 (#71000736)	Northwest Philadelphia 6206 Germantown Ave. 40°02′24″N 75°10′43″W	Germantown	Historic house, begun in 1690, the oldest in Germantown, the site of a British field hospital in the Battle of Germantown.

== See also ==
- National Register of Historic Places listings in Philadelphia, Pennsylvania
- List of Pennsylvania state historical markers in Philadelphia County
