= Institute of the Pennsylvania Hospital =

- Institute of Pennsylvania Hospital; Kirkbride's Hospital
- U.S. National Register of Historic Places
- U.S. National Historic Landmark
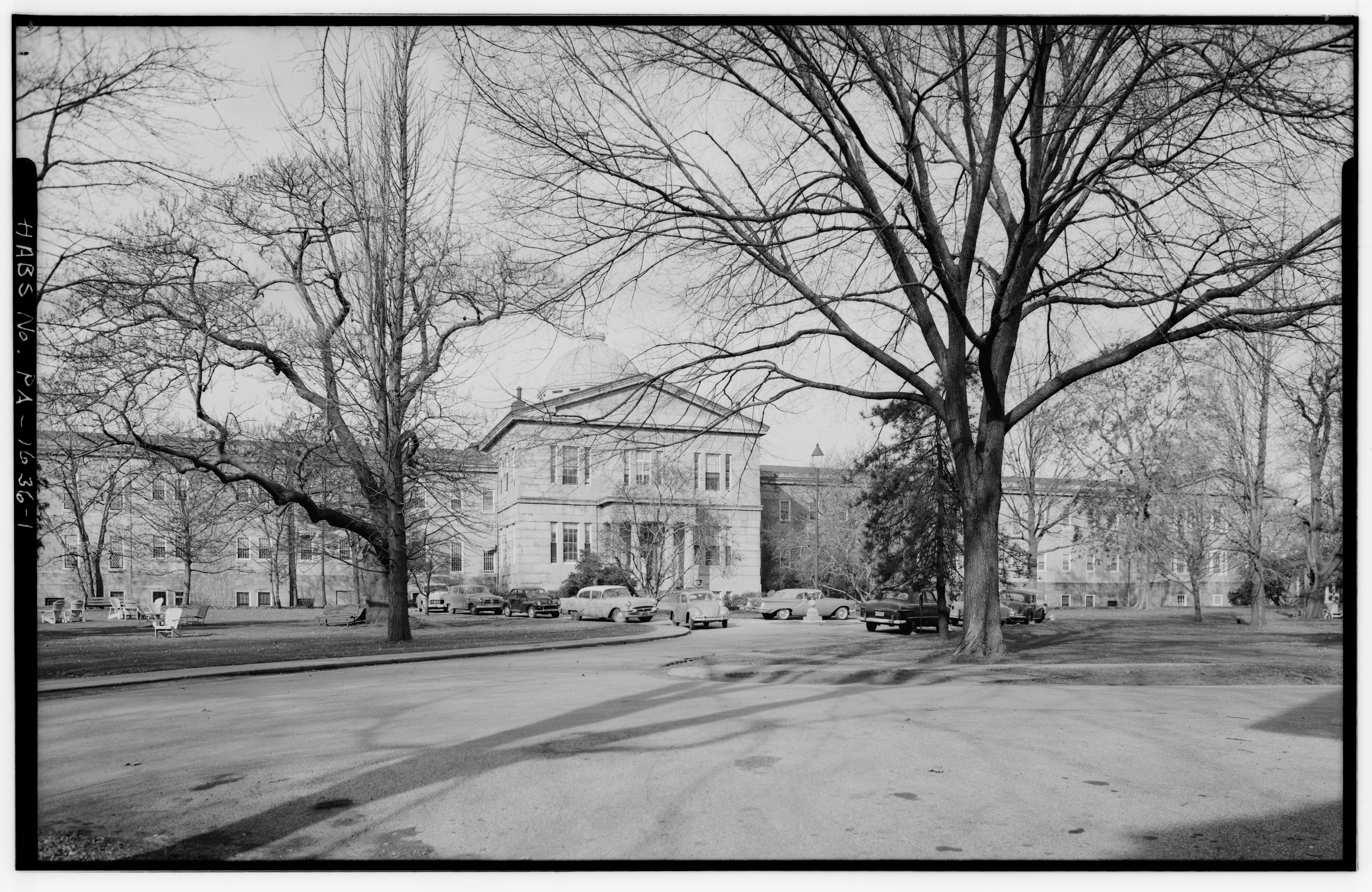
- Market Street facade in 1959.

- Location within Pennsylvania
- Location: 111 North 49th Street, Philadelphia, Pennsylvania
- Coordinates: 39°57′42″N 75°13′2″W
- Built: 1841; 1859
- Architectural style: Neoclassical
- NRHP reference No.: 66000684

Significant dates
- Added to NRHP: June 23, 1965
- Designated NHL: June 23, 1965

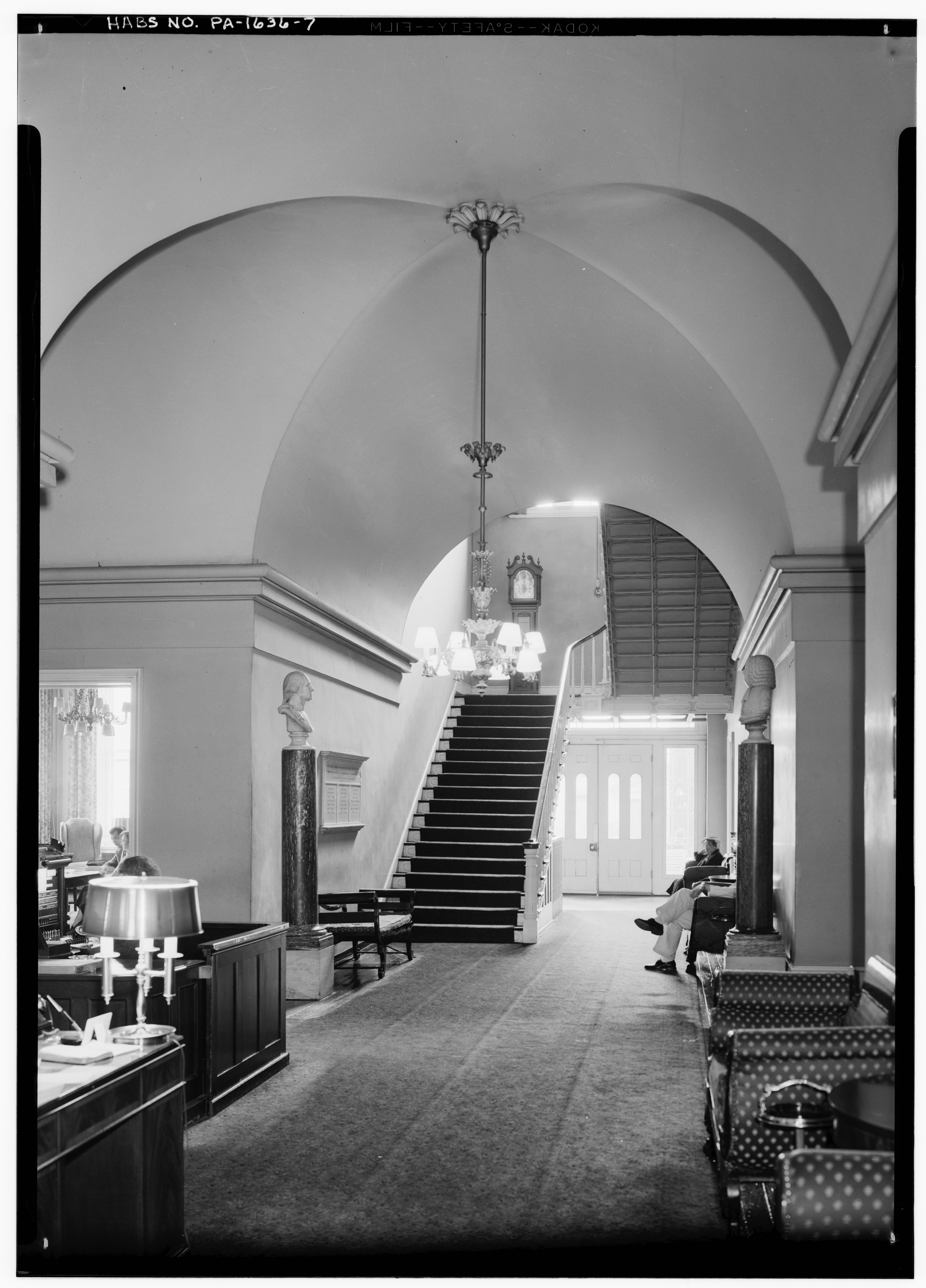
Interior, hall and stairway.

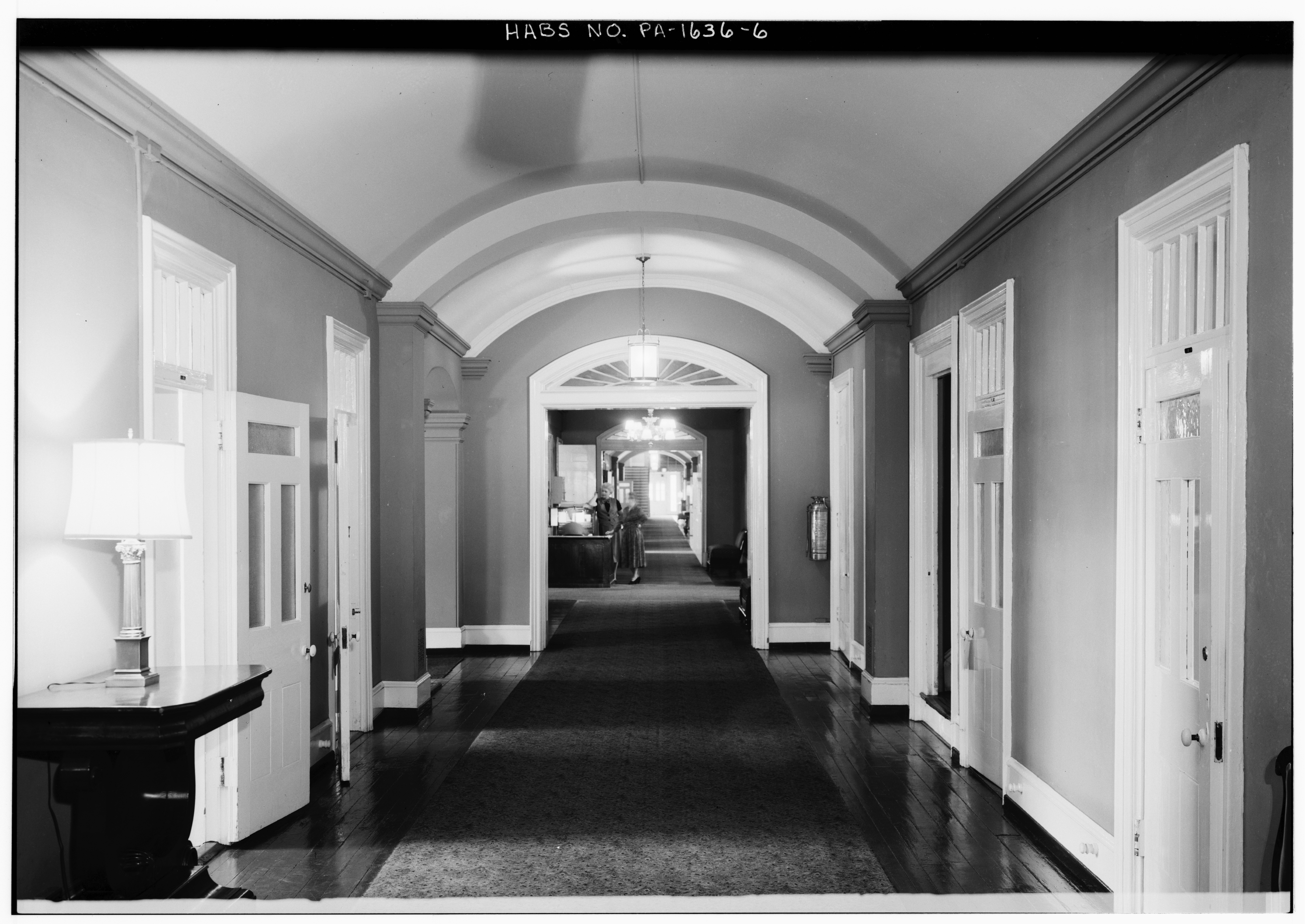
Interior, first floor hall.

The Institute of Pennsylvania Hospital, also known as Kirkbride's Hospital or the Pennsylvania Hospital for Mental and Nervous Diseases, was a psychiatric hospital located at 48th and Haverford Streets in Philadelphia, Pennsylvania, USA. It operated from its founding in 1841 until 1997. The remaining building, now called the Kirkbride Center is now part of the Blackwell Human Services Campus.

Two large hospital structures and an elaborate pleasure ground were built on a campus that stretched along the north side of Market Street, from 45th to 49th Streets. Thomas Story Kirkbride, the hospital's first superintendent and physician-in-chief, developed a more humane method of treatment for the mentally ill there, that became widely influential. The hospital's plan became a prototype for a generation of institutions for the treatment of the mentally ill nationwide. The surviving 1859 building was designated a National Historic Landmark in 1965.

== History ==
=== 19th century ===
Pennsylvania Asylum for the Insane—Kirkbride's Hospital

In the late 1830s, the managers of Pennsylvania Hospital began erecting a large asylum to replace the hospital's crowded insane wards at 8th and Spruce Streets. The 101-acre (41 ha) site chosen was a former farm in the as-yet unincorporated district of West Philadelphia. The first structure for the Pennsylvania Asylum for the Insane was designed by Isaac Holden and was located near what is now 46th and Market Streets. Completed in 1841, the facility offered comforts and a "humane treatment" philosophy that set a standard for its day. Unlike other asylums where patients were often kept chained in crowded, unsanitary wards with little if any treatment, patients at the Pennsylvania Asylum resided in private rooms, received medical treatment, worked outdoors and enjoyed recreational activities including lectures and a use of the hospital library. The facility came to be called "Kirkbride's Hospital."

Kirkbride Plan

Superintendent Thomas Kirkbride developed his treatment philosophy based on research he conducted at other progressive asylums of the day, including the one in Worcester, as well as his deep-seated personal opinions regarding mental health and his experience at the Pennsylvania Asylum. Out of his philosophy emerged the Kirkbride Plan, which created a model design for psychiatric hospital buildings that was used across the United States throughout the 19th century. He described his system in great detail in his influential work, On the Construction, Organization, and General Arrangements of Hospitals for the Insane with Some Remarks on Insanity and Its Treatment (1854).

Department for Males building

Overcrowding had become a problem in the original Pennsylvania Asylum for the Insane by the 1850s, so Kirkbride lobbied the Pennsylvania Hospital managers for an additional building. The situation offered him a unique opportunity to place his standardized concepts for mental hospital design and construction into effect at a facility under his control. The Pennsylvania Hospital's Department for Males building was soon constructed along 49th Street, a short distance west from the original asylum. Completed in 1859, this huge structure consisted of several wings extending from a main central building. It introduced many innovations in terms of spaciousness, airiness and light, that were subsequently widely reproduced in other facilities. Young architect Samuel Sloan, Kirkbride's friend and collaborator, designed the Neoclassical style building.

=== 20th century ===
Mental health services at the Institute of the Pennsylvania Hospital continued to expand throughout the 19th and early 20th centuries. But by the mid-20th century, the 1841 hospital building proved unusable for this purpose and was demolished in 1959. All treatment moved to the Department for Males building in 1959. That structure was listed on the National Register of Historic Places and was designated a National Historic Landmark on October 15, 1966.

The institute was located in what is now the Mill Creek neighborhood of Philadelphia. It continued operations until 1997 when, in the face of shrinking revenues from insurance providers, Pennsylvania Hospital sold the property and moved its mental health services back to the main hospital campus at 8th and Spruce Streets. Three tall housing projects and a multi-purpose social-service facility were built near the site of the 1841 hospital. Other parts of the property were sold for commercial and residential development in 2001.

== 21st century ==
The remaining Department for Males building is now the Kirkbride Center, a part of the Blackwell Human Services Campus. It houses the West Philadelphia ACES Charter School, Pennsylvania Hospital's Mill Creek School, Philadelphia Health Management Corporation's Adolescent Residential Treatment Center, and a Traveler's Aid's emergency family shelter.

== See also ==
- List of National Historic Landmarks in Philadelphia
- National Register of Historic Places listings in Philadelphia, Pennsylvania
