= Bartram's Garden =

Historic house in Pennsylvania, United States

- John Bartram House
- U.S. National Register of Historic Places
- U.S. National Historic Landmark
- Philadelphia Register of Historic Places
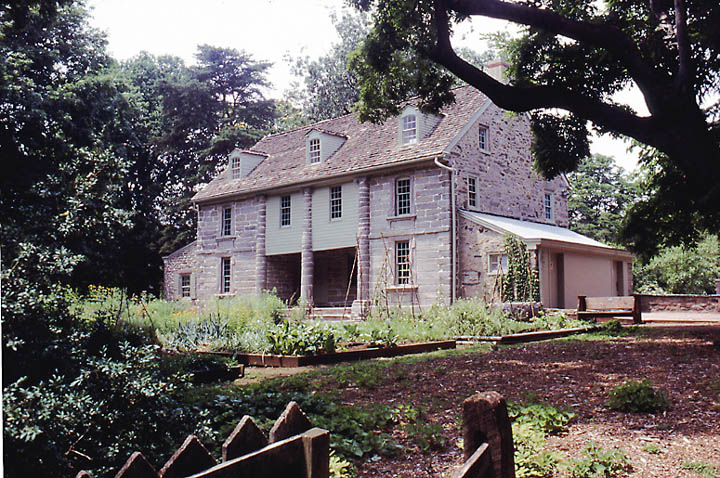
- John Bartram's house and upper garden at Bartram's Garden
- Location: 5400 Lindbergh Blvd., Philadelphia
- Coordinates: 39°55′50″N 75°12′45″W
- Built: 1728
- Architect: John Bartram
- Architectural style: Colonial
- Visitation: 100,000+ per year
- Website: www.bartramsgarden.org
- NRHP reference No.: 66000676

Significant dates
- Added to NRHP: October 9, 1960
- Designated NHL: October 9, 1960

Bartram's Garden is a 45-acre public garden and National Historic Landmark in Southwest Philadelphia, Pennsylvania, situated on the banks of the tidal Schuylkill River. Founded in 1728 by botanist John Bartram (1699–1777), it is the oldest botanical garden to survive in North America. The Garden is operated by the non-profit John Bartram Association in coordination with Philadelphia Parks and Recreation.

Bartram's Garden has the only recreational access to the tidal Schuylkill River and its wetlands. Its trails make up segments of the Schuylkill River Trail and the East Coast Greenway. The garden acts as an outdoor classroom for learning about the plants and history of Southwest Philadelphia. The John Bowman Bartram Special Collections Library contains an extensive collection of documents and materials related to the history of the Garden, the history of Philadelphia, and the development of the field of botany. The garden also serves as a venue for art.

== The garden ==
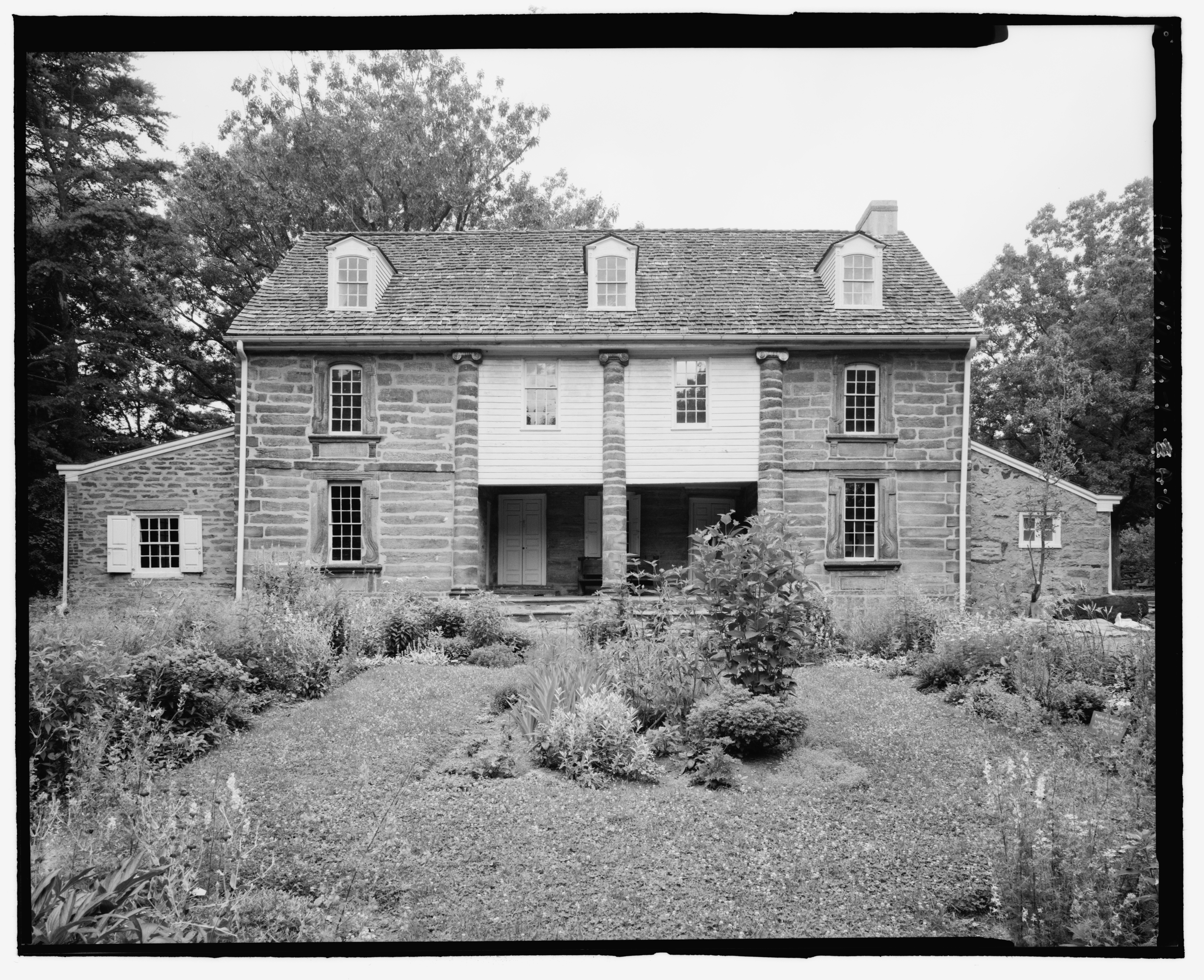
House and Garden, (East elevation).

Colonial American botanist John Bartram founded the garden on his farm in Kingsessing, west of the Schuylkill River and miles outside and south of the what were then the borders of Philadelphia. He built its stone house between 1728 and 1731, added a kitchen around 1740, and installed a Palladian-inspired, carved facade between 1758 and 1770.

The house still stands, as does his original garden (circa 1728) and greenhouse (1760). Three generations of the Bartram family continued the garden as the premier collection of North American plant species in the world. They sold it in 1850.

The current collection contains a wide variety of native and exotic species of herbaceous and woody plants. Most were listed in the Bartrams' 1783 broadside Catalogue of American Trees, Shrubs and Herbaceous Plants and subsequent editions.

The garden contains three notable trees:

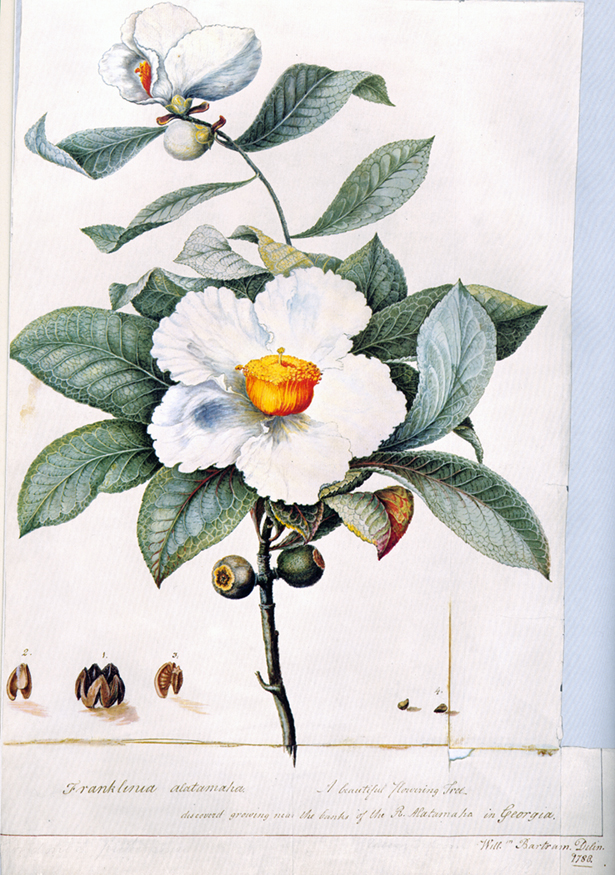
Franklinia alatamaha illustration by William Bartram

- Franklinia alatamaha (Franklin Tree): William and John Bartram, Jr. encountered a small grove of this tree on October 1, 1765 while camping by Georgia's Altamaha River. William eventually brought seeds to the Garden, where they were planted in 1777. The species, named in honor of John Bartram's friend Benjamin Franklin, was last seen in the wild in 1803. All Franklinia growing today are descended from those propagated and distributed by the Bartrams. They are credited with having saved it from extinction. There are a number of Franklinia on site at Bartram's Garden; the largest is located in the Common Flower Garden to the east of the Bartram House.
- Cladrastis kentukea (Yellowwood): A notably old tree, possibly collected by French plant explorer André Michaux in Tennessee in 1796 and later sent to William Bartram. This specimen is located by the Kitchen Garden to the east of the Bartram House; there is another large, though younger, specimen slightly further east.
- Ginkgo biloba (Ginkgo): This male ginkgo is believed to be the oldest ginkgo tree in North America, as the last of three original ginkgoes introduced in 1785 to the United States from China, via London. It is located to the east of the Bartram Barn.

== Landscape history ==
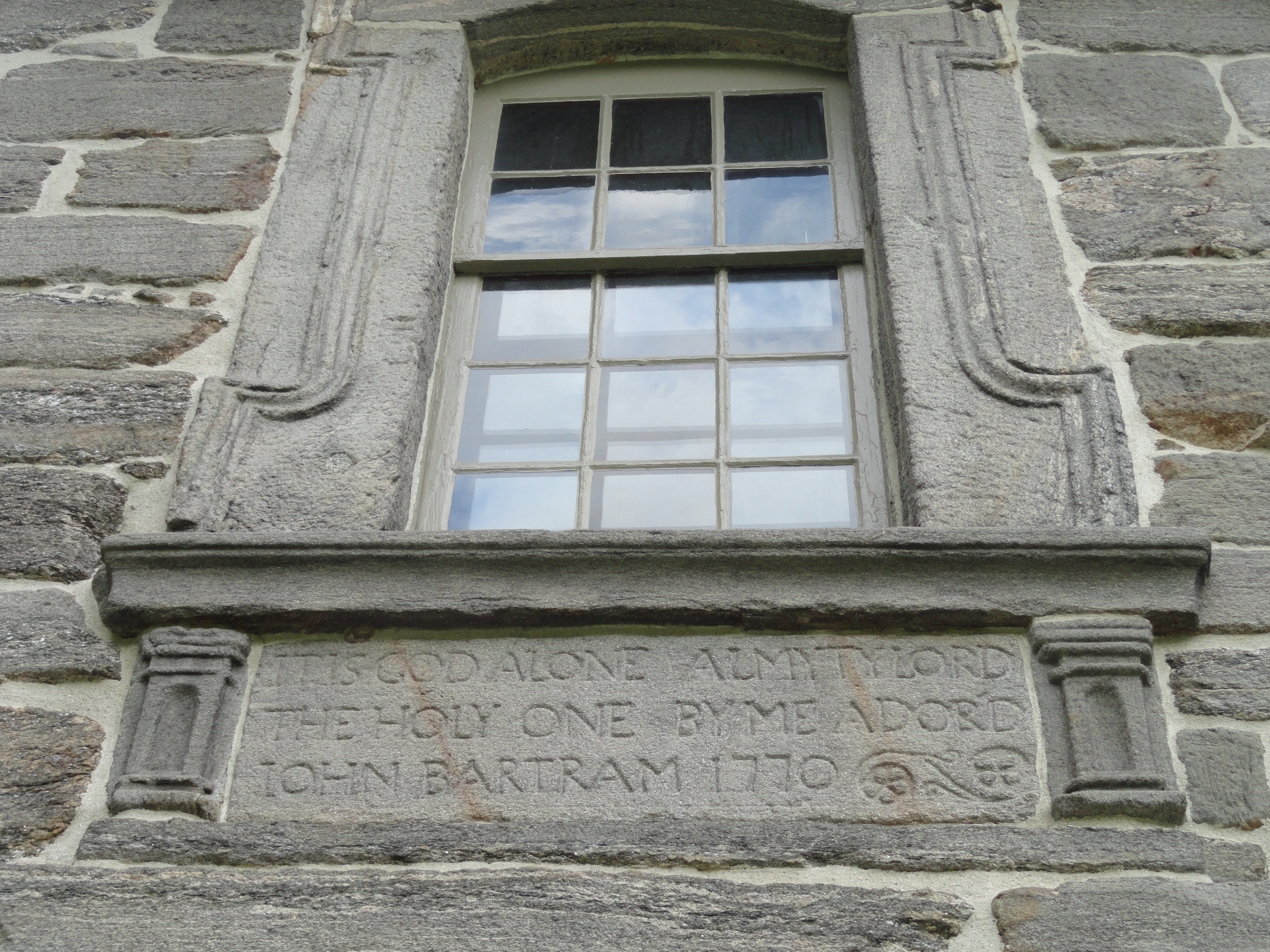
1770 stone carving by John Bartram on the east side of the Bartram House

Bartram's Garden is the oldest extant botanic garden in the United States. John Bartram (1699–1777), well-known in colonial American as a botanist, explorer, and plant collector, established the garden in September 1728 after purchasing a 102-acre (0.41 km^{2}) farm in Kingsessing Township, Philadelphia County.

A lifelong collector of plants, he developed his garden as a systematic collection. Increasingly he devoted himself to exploration, discovering new specimens and North American species, making substantial scientific achievements. John Bartram engaged in extensive exchanges of both plant materials and information with other botanists and operated a flourishing business based around transatlantic trade in plants. By the mid-eighteenth century, Bartram's Garden had "the most varied collection of North American plants in the world."

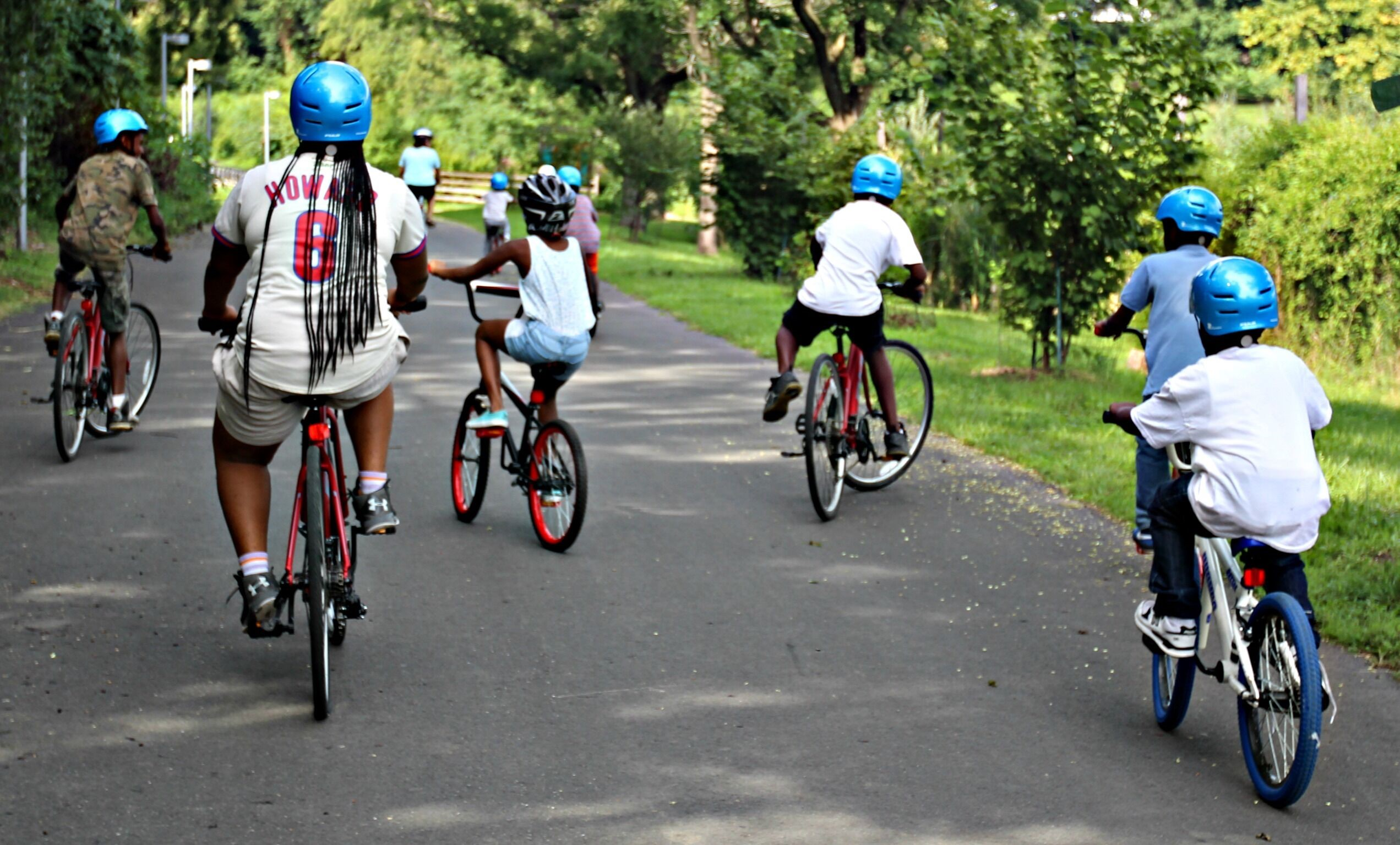
Biking on the Bartram's Mile trail at Bartram's Garden

After the American Revolution and John Bartram's death in 1777, Bartram's sons William Bartram (1739–1823) and John Bartram Jr. (1743–1812) continued the family's international trade in plants. They expanded both the botanic garden and the plant nursery. William became a respected naturalist, artist, and author using the garden to train the next generation of explorers and natural scientists.

While Philadelphia operated as the temporary capital of the new nation, prominent visitors to the garden included members of the Continental Congress of 1784 and President George Washington in 1787. Manasseh Cutler, an amateur botanist from Massachusetts, gave a detailed account of his visit to the garden in 1787. William Bartram's travel book, published in 1791, recorded his explorations in the South. Considered a classic in American nature writing, an edition was published as recently as 1998.

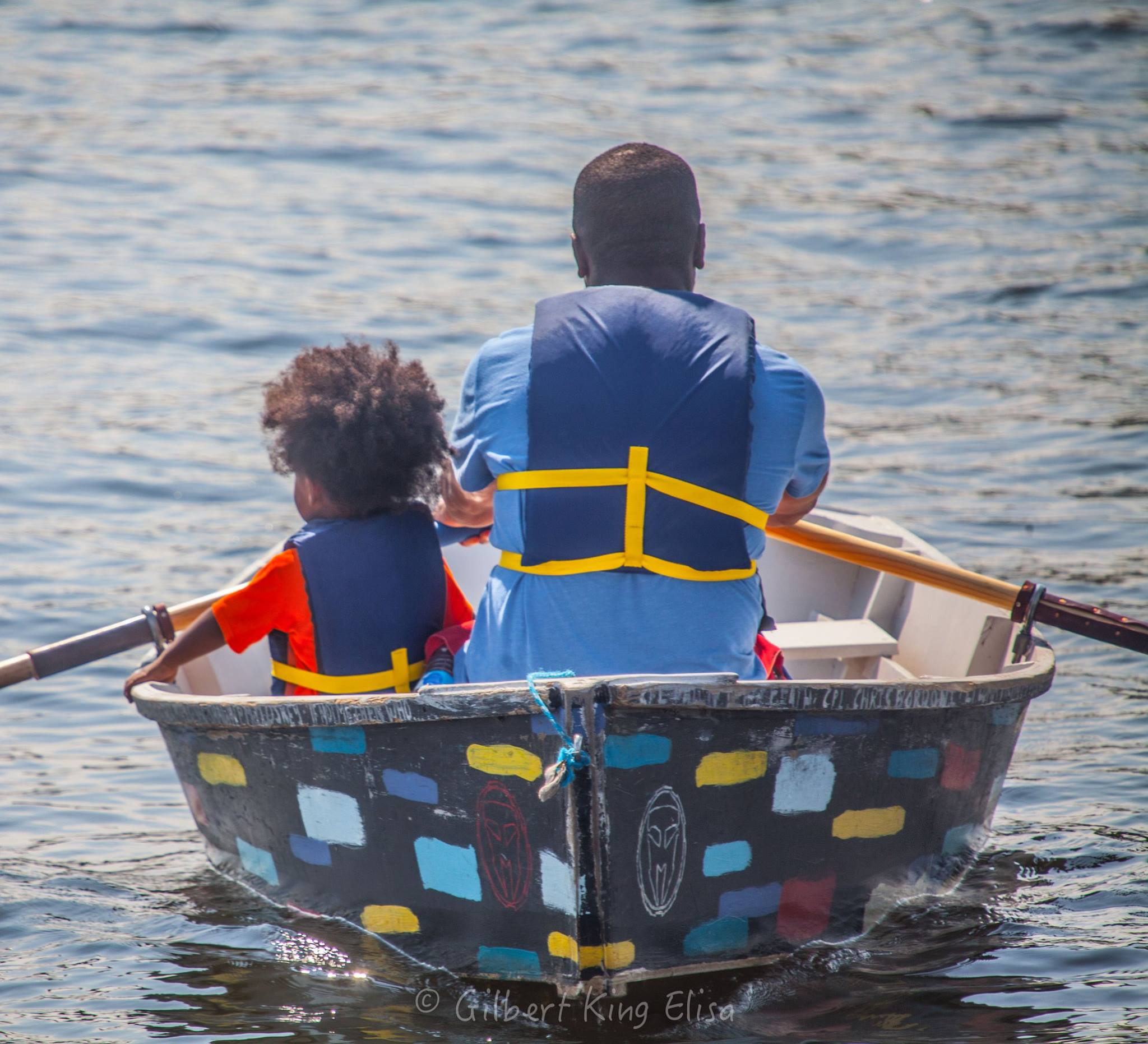
Bartram's Garden has a community boathouse for free rowboating, kayaking, and fishing on the tidal Schuylkill River. Rowboats are built by middle-school students at the nearby Richard Allen Preparatory Charter School.

After the death of John Bartram Jr. in 1812, his daughter Ann Bartram Carr (1779–1858) took over the farm and business, along with her husband Colonel Robert Carr (1778–1866) and later their son John Bartram Carr (1804–1839). They continued the international commercial trade in native plants of North America, shipping as many as 2,000 species of plants worldwide. Domestic demand also increased under their management, and they established an additional specimen garden to the west of the Bartram House to showcase popular new flowering plants. Ann Bartram Carr was the first of the Bartrams to open the garden to the public, planting a half-circle 1-acre garden for the enjoyment of the public, a green oasis in an increasingly industrial world.

In 1850, financial difficulties led the family to sell the garden to Andrew M. Eastwick (1811–1879), who purchased it as a private park for his estate. After Eastwick died in 1879, botanist Thomas Meehan (1826–1901) organized a campaign in Philadelphia to preserve the garden. Charles S. Sargent of Boston, Massachusetts, who worked at the Arnold Arboretum, helped to organize a national campaign for funds. The City of Philadelphia assumed control of the site in 1891, protecting it as a city park. The John Bartram Association was organized in 1893, to oversee preservation and presentation of the garden, house, and outbuildings. The garden was designated as a National Historic Landmark in 1960.

From 1879 and 1891, the garden was left wanting for care and interpretation. Many plants were stolen, damaged, or left to die. Despite the disappearance of a number of subsidiary physical elements in the landscape, the rectilinear framework that John Bartram designed and laid out in the eighteenth century can still be recognized.

The John Bowman Bartram Special Collections Library contains a vast collection of documents and materials related to the history of the Garden. A small number of examples in the garden's plant collection date from the Bartram family occupancy; however, documentation for what was once in cultivation is rich. This has supported efforts such as restoration of the Ann Bartram Carr Garden, a 19th-century semi-circular specimen garden to the west of the Bartram House. This area of the gardens was reopened in 2016.

In 2011, four acres along the Garden's southern border were established as the Sankofa Community Farm at Bartram's Garden, an African Diaspora-focused crop farm.

Bartram's Garden's long existence as a living botanical space, its focus on native plants, and its resonance with the surrounding area's history make it an unparalleled site for presenting and interpreting eighteenth- and nineteenth-century botanic and agricultural studies, the development of the field of botany, the plant and seed business in North American, the lives of John Bartram and his family, and domestic life in Philadelphia.

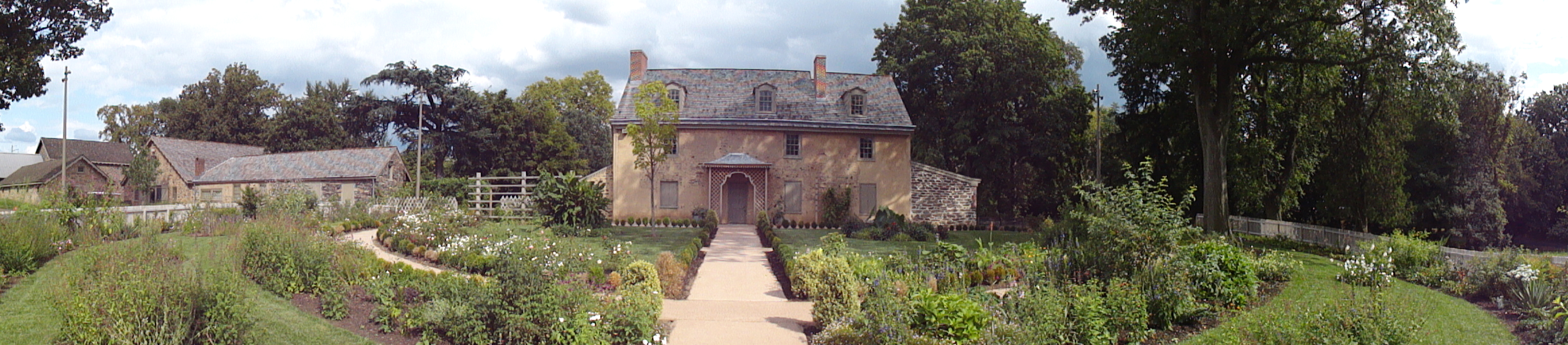
Digital panoramic photo of the Ann Bartram Carr Garden on the west-facing side of the Bartram House (center) taken August 2017

== Rambo's Rock ==
Rambo's Rock was a large boulder on the eastern edge of the Schuylkill River, directly across from Bartram's Garden, just south of Grays Ferry on the plantation of Swedish immigrants Peter and Brita Rambo. The rock has disappeared and been replaced with a wharf. 39.93°N 75.208°W

== Representation in popular culture ==
- Diana Gabaldon's novel Written in My Own Heart's Blood (2014), chapter 24, features the garden as the setting for the reunion of the two main protagonists. This is one of the series known as the Outlander novels.

== See also ==
- Schuylkill River Trail
- Bartram Village
- D. Landreth Seed Company
- List of parks in Philadelphia
- List of National Historic Landmarks in Philadelphia
- National Register of Historic Places listings in Southwest Philadelphia
