= Bartram Village =

- Neighborhood
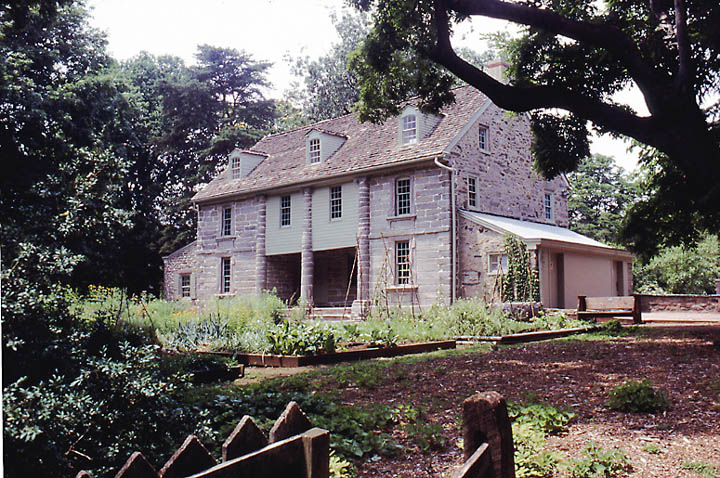
- John Bartram's house and upper garden in Bartram Village, Philadelphia

- Location within Philadelphia
- Country: United States
- State: Pennsylvania
- County: Philadelphia
- City: Philadelphia
- Area codes: 215, 267 and 445

Bartram Village is a small neighborhood in Southwest Philadelphia, Pennsylvania, United States. It is located in the vicinity of South 56th Street and Lindbergh Boulevard.

Bartram village borders Southwest Schuylkill to the northeast, Elmwood Park to the west, Kingsessing to the north and the Schuylkill River to the southeast. The neighborhood takes its name from noted botanist John Bartram, whose historical home and gardens, Bartram's Garden, are located nearby. Bartram's Garden, also known as the John Bartram House, is a National Historic Landmark.

Bartram Village is also the name of a housing project in the neighborhood located at 54th Street and Elmwood Avenue.

== See also ==
- Bartram's Garden
