= National Register of Historic Places listings in Philadelphia =

Location of Philadelphia in Pennsylvania

There are more than 600 properties and districts listed on the National Register of Historic Places in Philadelphia, including 67 National Historic Landmarks.

This National Park Service list is complete through NPS recent listings posted August 21, 2026.

== Number of listings by district ==
The properties are distributed across all of Philadelphia's 12 planning districts. East/West Oak Lane, Olney, Upper North and Lower North are included as North Philadelphia. Kensington, Near Northeast and Far Northeast are part of Northeast Philadelphia. Roxborough/Manayunk and Germantown/Chestnut Hill are a part of Northwest Philadelphia.

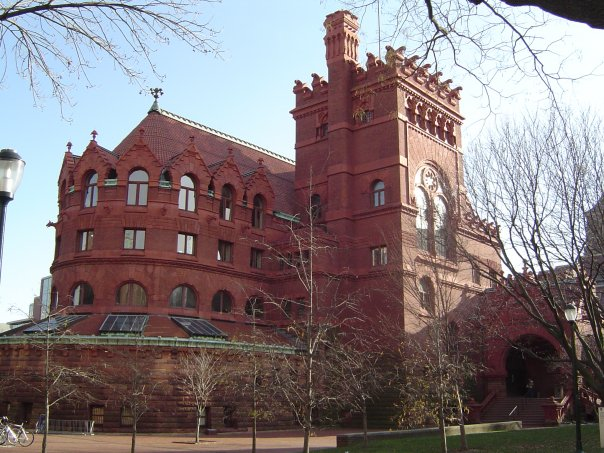
Furness Library, West Philadelphia

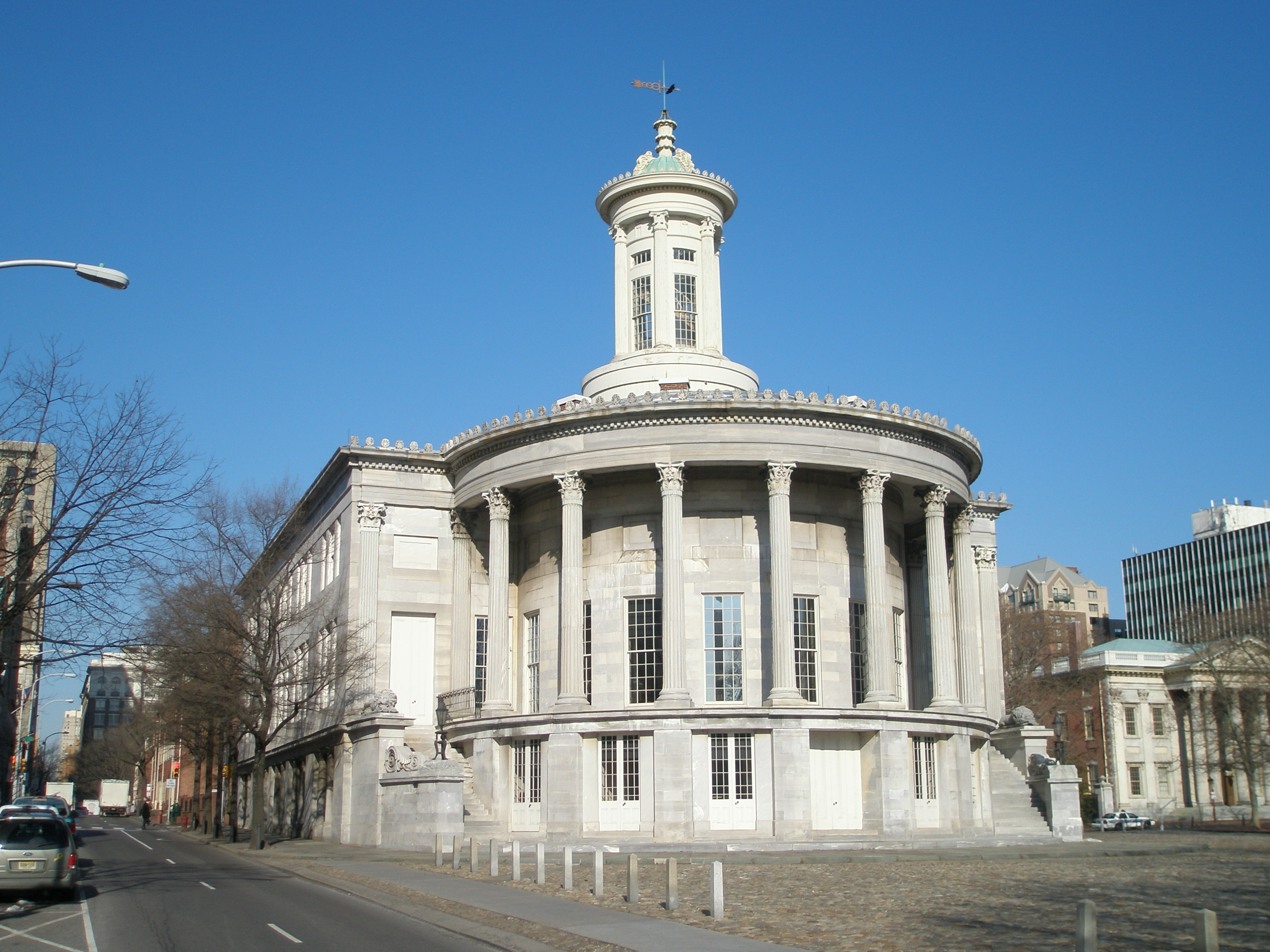
Merchants' Exchange Building, Center City

	District	# of Sites
1	Center City	150
2	North	173
3	Northeast	78
4	Northwest	80
5	South	65
6	Southwest	12
7	West	68
(Duplicates):		(5)
Total:		621

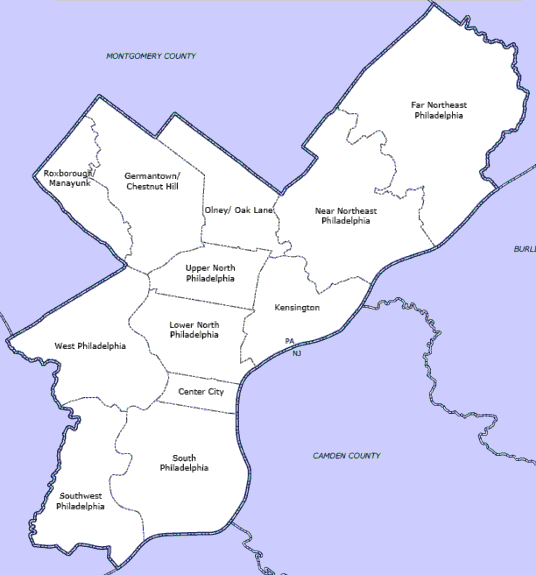
Philadelphia districts (clickable)

== See also ==
- Philadelphia Register of Historic Places
- List of Pennsylvania state historical markers in Philadelphia County
- List of National Historic Landmarks in Philadelphia
