= Thomas Story Kirkbride =

American psychiatrist (1809–1883)

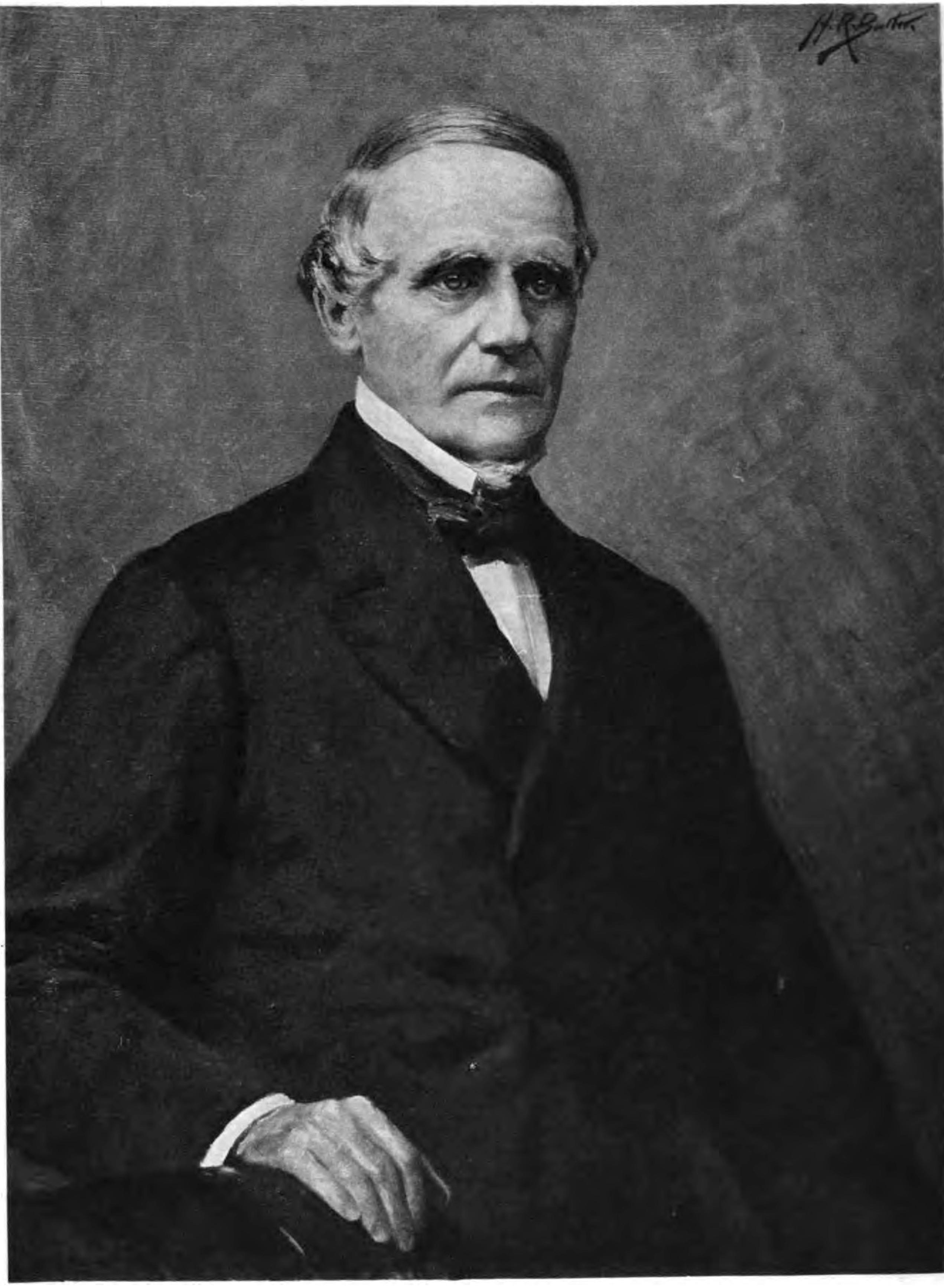
- Kirkbride in 1861
- Born: July 31, 1809; Morrisville, Pennsylvania, U.S.
- Died: December 16, 1883 (aged 74); Philadelphia, Pennsylvania, U.S.
- Resting place: Laurel Hill Cemetery, Philadelphia, Pennsylvania, U.S.
- Education: Trenton Academy; The College of New Jersey; University of Pennsylvania
- Occupations: Physician, alienist
- Known for: See list: Kirkbride Plan; American Psychiatric Association; Kirkbride Center; Institute of the Pennsylvania Hospital; State Hospital System
- Children: 6

Thomas Story Kirkbride (July 31, 1809 – December 16, 1883) was a medical doctor, psychiatrist, and hospital superintendent for the Institute of the Pennsylvania Hospital, and primary founder of the Association of Medical Superintendents of American Institutions for the Insane (AMSAII), the organizational precursor to the American Psychiatric Association. Along with Benjamin Rush, he is considered to be the father of the modern American practice of psychiatry as a specific medical discipline. His directive and organization of institutions for the insane were the gold standard of clinical care in psychiatry throughout the 19th century.

== Early career ==
Kirkbride was born on July 31, 1809, on a farm in Morrisville, Pennsylvania, into a wealthy Orthodox Quaker family. He was the son of John Kirkbride and Elizabeth Story, and he resided on the family farm outside of Newtown, Pennsylvania, along with his younger sister Rachel Story Kirkbride. He received his primary education at the Quaker school at Fallsington and later at Trenton Academy. His great-great-grandfather, Joseph Kirkbride (1662–1736), was one of the original settlers of Pennsylvania with a land grant from William Penn in 1682. When he was 18 years old, he started his formal education under Nicholas Belleville of Trenton, New Jersey, and Presbyterian minister Rev. Jared D. Tyler at the College of New Jersey. He was enrolled at the medical school at the University of Pennsylvania in August 1831, receiving a medical degree in March 1832. Following his academic coursework he was assigned as a medical resident at the Quaker Asylum at Frankford (now Friends Hospital). Kirkbride operated his own medical-surgical practice in the city of Philadelphia from 1835 to 1841 that focused mainly on neurological and psychosurgical interventions. He was honored with a membership to the American Philosophical Society in 1851, a national award rarely granted to physicians. Kirkbride was also the vice president of the Pennsylvania Institution for the Instruction of the Blind (now known as Overbrook School for the Blind) from 1844 until his death in 1883.

== Professional practice ==
In October 1840, Kirkbride was named the first superintendent of the Pennsylvania Hospital for the Insane by the board of managers of Pennsylvania Hospital. In January 1841, the first patients were admitted to the ward to offer relief to the site of Pennsylvania Hospital's South Philadelphia campus.

In Philadelphia during October 1844, Kirkbride helped found the Association of Medical Superintendents of American Institutions for the Insane (AMSAII). He held the position of secretary for seven years, treasurer, vice president for two years, and president for eight years between 1862 and 1870. Kirkbride pioneered what would be known as the Kirkbride Plan, which aimed to improve medical care for the insane, through standardization of buildings that housed patients.

Kirkbride's magnum opus, On the Construction, Organization, and General Arrangements of Hospitals for the Insane with Some Remarks on Insanity and Its Treatment, was published in 1854, and again in 1880, and was the source book for 19th-century psychiatric directives.

Towards the end of his life, Lafayette College awarded him an LL. D "in recognition of his eminent ability and the remarkable services rendered to suffering humanity". In 1874, he addressed the legislature of the Commonwealth of Pennsylvania, advocating for the expansion of state-sponsored clinical care for the insane. His efforts, and that of his medical peers, saw the allocation of funds for Norristown State Hospital in 1878. Subsequent to this appeal, he was offered the position of superintendent of the male department of the new state hospital, which he declined, preferring to maintain his in-patient practice in Philadelphia.

== Personal life ==
Kirkbride was devoutly religious and a lifelong member of the Religious Society of Friends, attending services at the Twelfth Street Meeting House from 1833 until his death. Kirkbride also had his funeral services conducted at this Orthodox Friends meetinghouse. He married Ann West Jenks (1812–1862) in 1839. Together, they had two children. After Ann died, he married Eliza Ogden Butler (1835–1919), one of his former patients. Together, they had four children.

Kirkbride experienced a prolonged respiratory illness starting in June 1883, which continued until his death from pneumonia on December 16, 1883, at his home on the grounds of the Pennsylvania Hospital for the Insane. He was interred at Laurel Hill Cemetery in Philadelphia. His eldest son, Joseph, followed in his father's footsteps, attending both the University of Pennsylvania and Philadelphia College of Pharmacy, becoming a physician in the outpatient department of Pennsylvania Hospital. His younger son, Thomas S. Kirkbride Jr. (d. 1900) also became a urologist. His grave in Laurel Hill is plain in the Quaker style, saving only the inclusion of "Doctor of Medicine" after his name.

== Select professional publications ==
- Kirkbride, T.S. (1843). Reports of the Pennsylvania Hospital for the Insane for the year 1843. University of Pennsylvania Press, Philadelphia, PA
- Kirkbride, T.S. (1845). Proceedings of the Association of Medical Superintendents of American Institutions for the Insane. American Journal of the Medical Sciences, XI(1), p. 249-250
- Kirkbride, T.S. (1846). Reports of the Pennsylvania Hospital for the Insane: with a sketch of its history, buildings, and organization. University of Pennsylvania Press, Philadelphia, PA
- Kirkbride, T.S. (1848). Editorial and American Medical Retrospect. The New York Journal of Medicine, I(3), p. 247-250
- Kirkbride, T.S. (1850). Notice of some Experiments in Heating and Ventilating Hospitals and other Buildings, by Steam and Hot Water. With Remarks. The American Journal of the Medical Sciences, p. 298-319
- Kirkbride, T.S. (1850). Reports of the Pennsylvania Hospital for the Insane for 1842, 1846, 1847, 1849, 1850. University of Pennsylvania Press, Philadelphia, PA
- Kirkbride, T.S. (1854). On the Construction, Organization, and General Arrangements of Hospitals for the Insane with Some Remarks on Insanity and Its Treatment. Lindsay & Blakiston, Philadelphia, PA
- Kirkbride, T.S. (1854). Letter to the Regents of the South Carolina Hospital for the Insane. TK and PG Collins Printers, Columbia, SC
- Kirkbride, T.S. (1855). Reports of the Pennsylvania Hospital for the Insane for the year 1854. University of Pennsylvania Press, Philadelphia, PA
- Kirkbride, T.S. (1866). Biographical memoir of the late William Pepper, M.D. Collins Printer, Philadelphia, PA
- Kirkbride, T.S.; Ray, I.; Reed, J.A.; Worthington, J.H. (1874). To the Senate and House of Representatives of the Commonwealth of Pennsylvania : the undersigned, citizens of Pennsylvania, who are, or have been, actively engaged in the care of the insane. Published on behalf of the Commonwealth of Pennsylvania for legislative audience on Feb. 19, 1874
- Kirkbride, T.S. (1881). Memoir of Isaac Ray, M.D., LL. D. : read before the College of Physicians of Philadelphia, July 6, 1881. Collins Printer, Philadelphia, PA
- Curwen, J.; Kirkbride, T.S. (1885). Memoir of Thomas S. Kirkbride MC LLD. E. Cowan & Co. Printers, Warren, PA
