= Southwest Philadelphia =

Coordinates: 39.898299°N 75.236238°W

- Neighborhood of Philadelphia
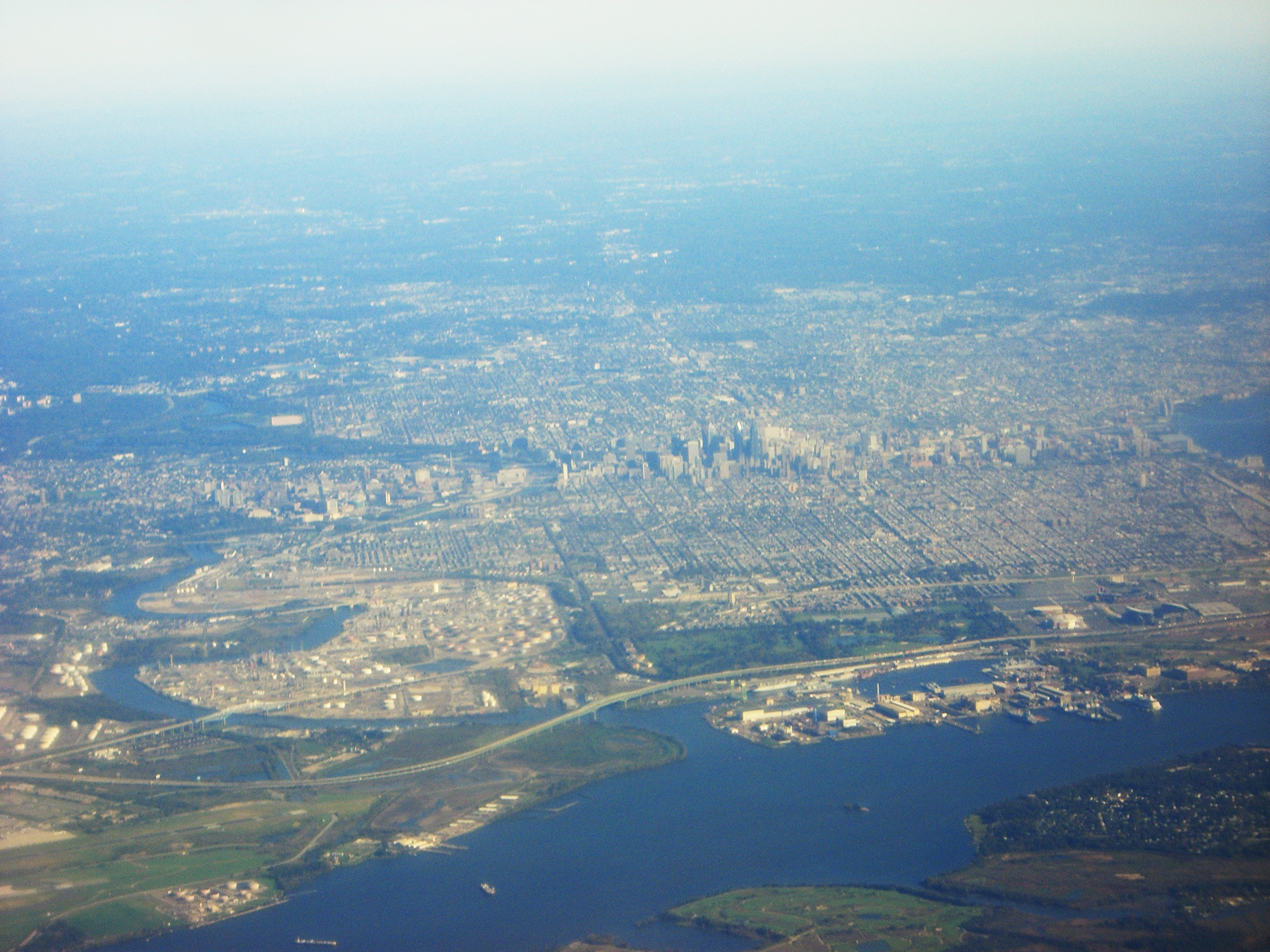
- Southwest Philadelphia as viewed from an airplane

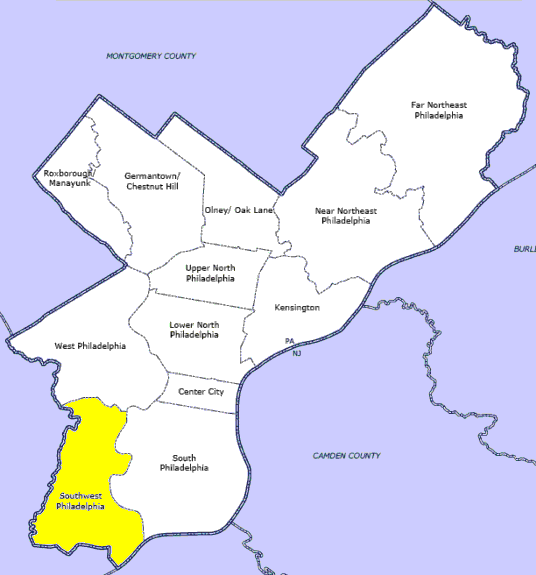
- Southwest Philadelphia, as defined by the Philadelphia City Planning Commission
- Country: United States
- State: Pennsylvania
- County: Philadelphia
- City: Philadelphia

Area
  - Total: 10.6 sq mi (27 km^{2})

Population (2010)
  - Total: 123,829
  - Density: 5,192/sq mi (2,005/km^{2})

Demographics
  - White: 10.3%
  - Black: 75.4%
  - Native: 0.3%
  - Asian: 4.6%
  - Pacific Islander: 0.1%
  - Multiracial: 6.3%
  - Other: 3.0%
- ZIP code: 19142, 19143, 19153

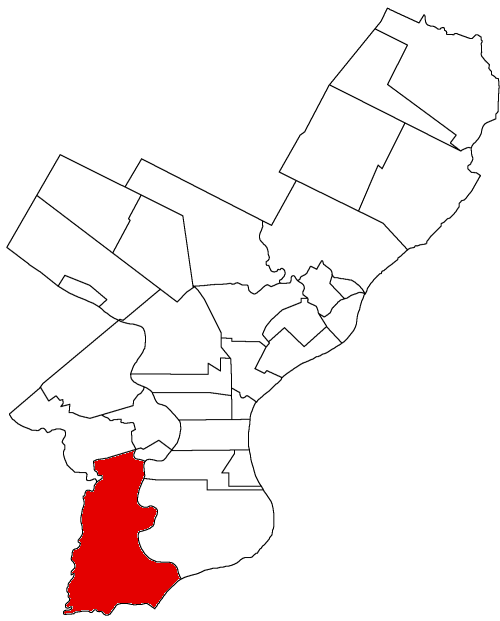
Map of Philadelphia County, Pennsylvania, highlighting West Philadelphia Borough before the 1854 Act of Consolidation

Southwest Philadelphia (formerly Kingsessing Township) is a section of Philadelphia, Pennsylvania, United States. The section can be described as extending from the western side of the Schuylkill River to the city line, with the SEPTA. The northern border is defined by the Philadelphia City Planning Commission as east from the city line along Baltimore Avenue moving south along 51st Street to Springfield Ave. It follows the train tracks until 49th Street. From 49th and Kingsessing Ave the line moves east along Kingsessing Ave. The line then moves south along 46th St to Paschall Ave where it jogs to join Grays Ferry where the line runs to the Schuylkill River.

Southwest Philadelphia is also described by the city as being the area south of Baltimore Avenue; at the turn of the 20th century, Baltimore Avenue between 49th and 52nd Streets was known as "The Hub of Southwest Philadelphia" . Historically home to many Irish American neighborhoods, the section now has a large African American and West African immigrant population; a recent nickname is "Little Africa".

Southwest Philadelphia contains portions of Philadelphia International Airport, oil refineries, and other heavy industries.

The housing stock is diverse with ornate Queen Anne-style twin mansions in the neighborhoods bordering Cedar Park, plainer and simpler styles of twins predominating closer to the airport, and newer rowhouses, many with porches, filling in many neighborhoods.

Less than 1% of Southwest is covered by trees, giving it one of the lowest ratios of shade tree cover in the city.

The Philadelphia Police Department patrols the 12th and 77th districts within Southwest Philadelphia.

== History ==
Kingsessing Township was a township in the extreme southwestern portion of the county, roughly encompassing what is now known today as Southwest Philadelphia. It was bounded on the north by Blockley Township; on the east by Mill Creek and Schuylkill River; on the south by Delaware River and Bow Creek; and on the west by Darby Creek and Cobbs Creek. It embraces the site of the old village of Kingsessing. The township contained no other settlements of any size except Maylandville. It was traversed principally by the Darby Road and the road to Lazaretto. Its greatest length, 5 miles (8.0 km); greatest breadth, 2 1/2 miles (4.0 km); area, 6,800 acres (28 km^{2}). This was the oldest settled portion of the county of Philadelphia.

The Kingsessing settlement was started by Swedes who settled the colony of New Sweden. Most of the settlers were Finns. Dating to 1646, it was the first village settled by Europeans within the territory of Philadelphia. Fort Nya Vasa at Kingsessing, was located on the eastern-side of Cobbs Creek near Cobbs Creek Parkway and Greenway Avenue.

The township of Kingsessing was created not long after control of the colony was transferred to William Penn. The township and village were incorporated into the City of Philadelphia following the Act of Consolidation, 1854.

For the 18th and most of the 19th centuries Kingessing was a rural township with farms, orchards and market gardens. A major botanic and horticultural garden, Bartram's Garden was located in Kingessing Township, and was frequently called the "Kingsess Garden." By the middle of the 19th century, Kingessing was a major center for the nursery and florist gardens in Philadelphia County.

The name Kingsessing or Chinsessing comes from the Lenape word for "a place where there is a meadow". The origins of Kingsessing are found in the village of the same name that roughly occupied the same site as the current neighborhood. Kingsessing became the name of the township in which the original Lenape and Swedish village stood.

== Population ==
More than 80,000 people live in Southwest Philadelphia. It is approximately 60% black, 36% white, and 4% Asian.

Until the late 1960s, the Southwest section of Philadelphia was commonly associated with Irish-Americans until Southeast Asian refugees settled in the area along with African-Americans from nearby West Philadelphia. Philadelphia's West African community has been most concentrated in Southwest Philadelphia and Northeast Philadelphia starting from the late 1990s with significant growth in the early 2000s. The majority of the immigrants are mainly Liberian refugees from the Gio, Mano, Mandingo, Krahn, Grebo, and Kru ethnic groups, along with immigrants from Guinea, Sierra Leone, and Côte d'Ivoire. Southwest Philadelphia has long been called a haven for refugees.

== Transportation ==
A number of SEPTA Subway-Surface Trolley Lines traverse the area along Chester, Woodland, and Elmwood Avenues, providing easy access to Center City through the 40th Street Portal. These also extend to Darby and Yeadon.

Southwest Philadelphia is served by four of the five Subway-Surface Lines (Trolleys): T2, T3, T4, and T5. It is also served by bus routes 12, 37, 52, 63, 64, 108, and by the Airport and Media/Wawa Regional Rail lines.

- Airport Line - Eastwick Station & Terminus at the Airport
- Media/Wawa Line - 49th St & Angora Station
- Route T2 runs along Baltimore Avenue to Angora
- Route T3 runs along Chester Avenue to Yeadon, with some scheduled trips extending to Darby with route T4
- Route T4 runs along Woodland Avenue to Darby
- Route T5 runs along Elmwood Avenue to Eastwick near Philadelphia International Airport

== See also ==
- Bartram's Garden
- Newkirk Viaduct Monument
