= William Bartram (disambiguation) =

William Bartram (1739–1823) was an American naturalist, writer, and explorer

William Bartram may also refer to:

- William Bartram (Pennsylvania politician) (1674–1711), grandfather of the naturalist
- William Bartram (North Carolina politician) (1711–1770), uncle of the naturalist

== See also ==
- William Bertram (disambiguation)
