= Bartram's Travels =

1791 book by William Bartram

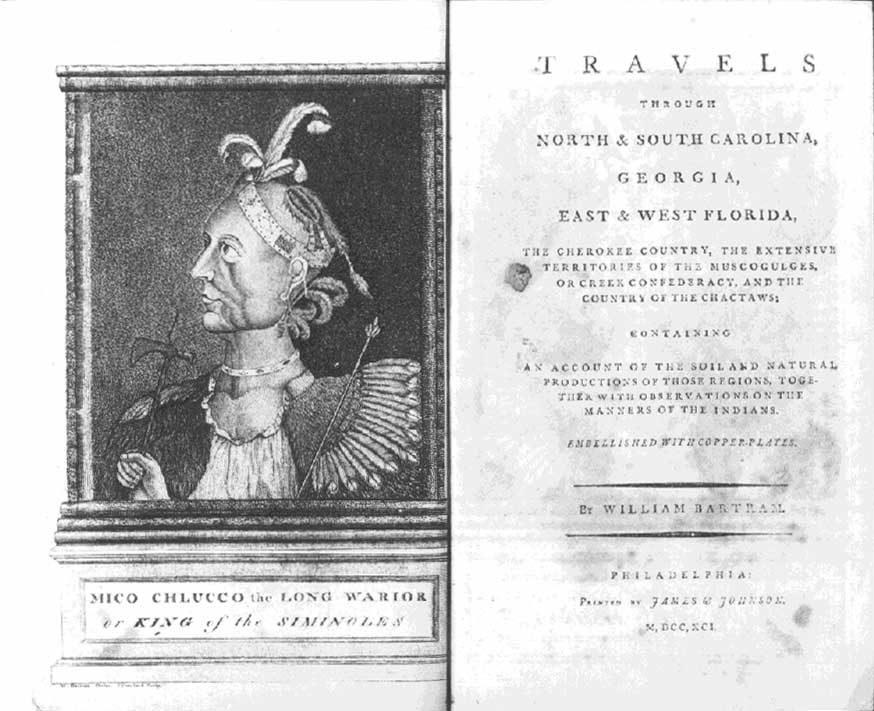
Title page of Bartram's Travels with frontispiece "Mico Chlucco the Long Warrior"

Bartram's Travels is the short title of naturalist William Bartram's book describing his travels in the American South and encounters with American Indians between 1773 and 1777. The book was published in Philadelphia, Pennsylvania in 1791 by the firm of James & Johnson.

The book's full title is Travels through North and South Carolina, Georgia, East and West Florida, the Cherokee Country, the Extensive Territories of the Muscogulges or Creek Confederacy, and the Country of the Chactaws. Containing an Account of the Soil and Natural Productions of Those Regions; Together with Observations on the Manners of the Indians.

== The travels ==
William Bartram was a Quaker and the son of naturalist John Bartram. In 1772, Dr. John Fothergill of London commissioned William Bartram to explore the Florida territories, collecting seeds, making drawings, and taking specimens of unfamiliar plants. Bartram sailed from Philadelphia in March 1773, explored Georgia, and began exploring East Florida in March 1774, especially the St. Johns River and the Alachua Savanna peopled by Seminole Indians. Returning to Charleston, Bartram set out for the southern Appalachians and the Cherokee country in April 1775, unaware that war had broken out in New England. Bartram crossed the Chattahoochee River into what later became the state of Alabama, then traveled to Mobile and Pensacola. Despite illness, he continued his journey west along the Gulf coast and up the Mississippi River beyond Baton Rouge. Sailing again to Mobile, he traveled inland late in the year to the Creek Indian settlements on the Tallapoosa River. In January 1776 Bartram returned to Georgia, shipped the last of his plant specimens to London from Savannah, and returned home to Philadelphia. The sequence of his journey is not reproduced exactly in Bartram's Travels.

Between 1774 and 1776 Bartram sent 59 drawings and 209 dried plant specimens to Fothergill, along with a two-part report of his travels. This report was not published during Bartram's lifetime and is not to be confused with the book.

The present-day Bartram Trail system, including the Bartram Canoe Trail, commemorates William Bartram’s journey by marking segments of his approximate route in Alabama, Florida, Georgia, North Carolina, and South Carolina.

== Publication history ==
Bartram remained in Philadelphia during the Revolutionary War. There he wrote the manuscript of his book while restoring the botanical garden established by his father at the family home in Kingsessing. The German scientist Johann David Schöpf saw the unpublished manuscript during a visit in 1783. A first effort to publish the Travels, by Philadelphia publisher Enoch Story, Jr. in 1786, apparently failed to attract subscribers. Finally in 1790 James and Johnson issued a second proposal to publish the Travels, and among the subscribers were President George Washington, Vice President John Adams, and Secretary of State Thomas Jefferson. Bartram dedicated the book to Pennsylvania governor Thomas Mifflin.

The book was deposited for copyright on August 26, 1791, and printed in Philadelphia between that date and January 1792. The number of copies printed is unknown, but was probably fewer than 1,000. The price per copy was "two Spanish milled dollars." Bartram probably received 10 percent royalties.

Bartram expressed dissatisfaction with the first edition of his book, which contained many errors, especially in the spelling of scientific names. He enclosed a list of 28 errata in a copy he gave to a neighbor. No second American edition was published in his lifetime.

== Significance ==
Bartram's Travels is significant as a scientific work, as a historical source concerning American Indians and the American South, and as a contribution to American literature. The reviewer in the Massachusetts Magazine found Bartram's literary style "rather too luxuriant and florid", but overall the book was praised highly in the United States and Europe.

Early readers were sometimes skeptical about the accuracy of Bartram's description of what was then an exotic part of the world. But as the regions became more familiar to scientists in the nineteenth century, Bartram's accuracy was confirmed. He is considered the scientific discoverer of several plant species, including the Franklin tree (Franklinia alatamaha), which was rare when Bartram described it and later became extinct in the wild. Because of the sixteen-year delay between the completion of his travels and the publication of his book, Bartram missed the opportunity to be recognized as the first describer of several more species. German botanists considered Bartram to be the only noteworthy American botanist of his time.

Critics were often skeptical of Bartram's sympathetic description of the Creek, Seminole, Cherokee, and Choctaw Indians, which challenged presumptions that the Indians were primitive "savages." In addition to the Travels Bartram wrote other documents concerning his impressions of the southern Indians and the necessity of a humane public policy toward them.

Among Bartram's admirers in England were the poets William Wordsworth and Samuel Taylor Coleridge. By his own account, Coleridge had Bartram's Travels in mind when he devised the exotic imagery in his poems The Rime of the Ancient Mariner and Kubla Khan. In Specimens of the Table Talk of S.T. Coleridge, Coleridge is noted as having said, "It is a work of high merit every way." (March 12, 1827)

== European editions ==
Bartram's Travels appeared in Europe when an edition was published in London in 1792, and another in Dublin in 1793. Also in 1793, the Travels appeared in German as William Bartram's Reisen, translated by Eberhard August Wilhelm von Zimmermann. The book was published almost simultaneously in Berlin and Vienna.

A second London edition of the Travels appeared in 1794, and this is the edition owned by Wordsworth and Coleridge. In the same year, Jan David Pasteur's Dutch translation was published in Haarlem. It was published again in 1797.

A French translation by Pierre Vincent Benoist, Voyage dans le parties sud de l'Amérique septentrionale, appeared in 1799 in Paris, followed by a second edition in 1801.

== Modern editions ==
- The Travels of William Bartram: Naturalist's Edition. Edited by Francis Harper. New Haven, Conn.: Yale University Press, 1958. Reprint, Athens: University of Georgia Press, 1998. ISBN 0-8203-2027-7
- Travels and Other Writings. Thomas P. Slaughter, editor. New York: Library of America, 1996. ISBN 978-1-883011-11-6
- Travels through North and South Carolina, Georgia, East and West Florida, the Cherokee Country.... Introduction by James Dickey. New York: Viking Penguin, 1996.
- Travels through North and South Carolina, Georgia, East and West Florida: A facsimile of the 1792 London edition embellished with its nine original plates. Introduction by Gordon DeWolf. Charlottesville: University of Virginia Press, 1980.
- Travels. Introduction by Mark Van Doren. New York: Dover, 1928. ISBN 0-486-20013-2
