= John Bartram (disambiguation) =

John Bartram (1699–1777) was an American botanist

John Bartram may also refer to:

- John Bartram (politician) (c. 1650–1697) – grandfather of the botanist
- John Bartram (athlete) (1925–2014) – Australian track and field athlete
