= Fort Picolata =

- Northwest of St. Augustine, Florida, on east bank of the St. Johns River in United States
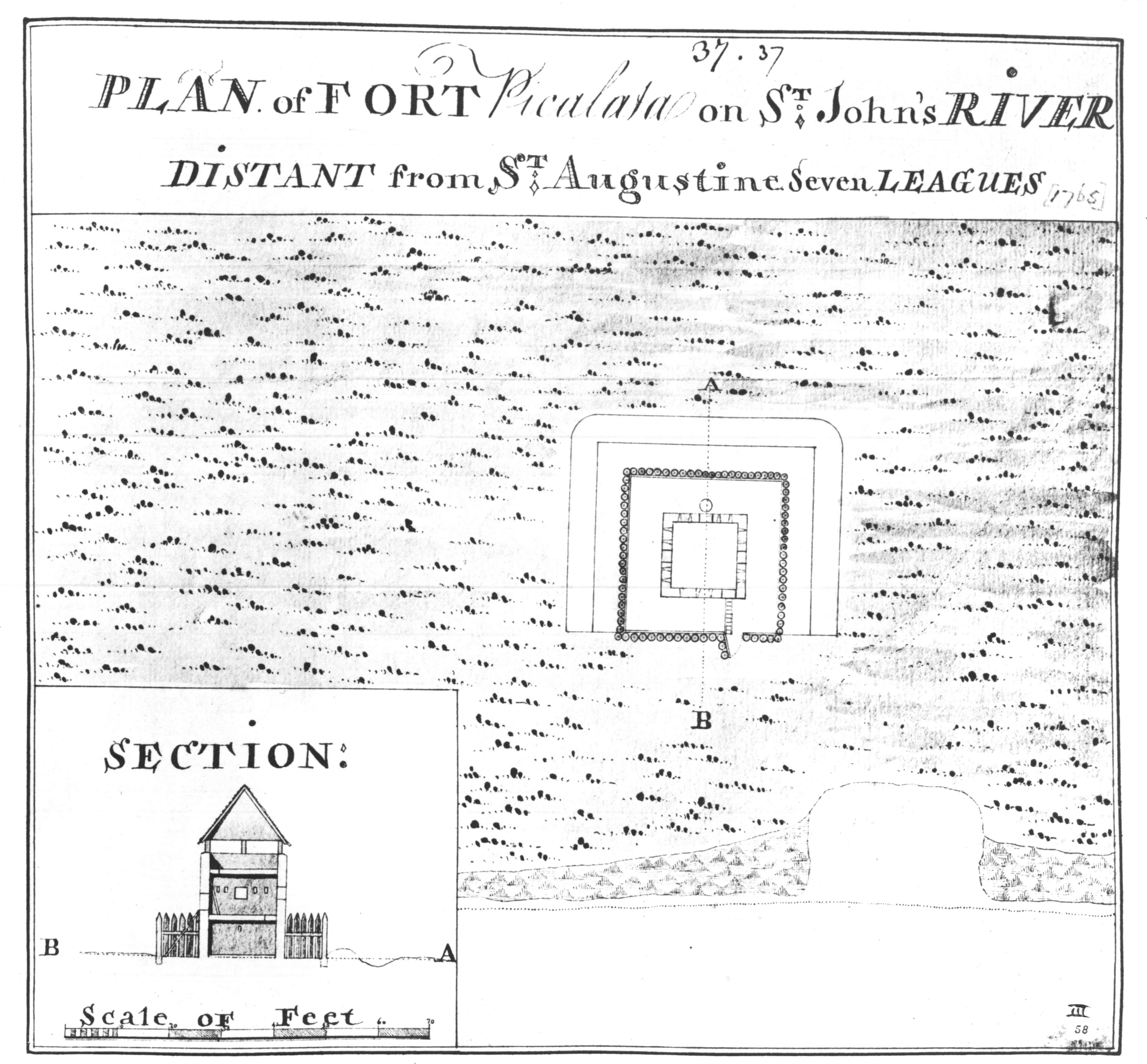
- Plan of Fort Picalata on St. Johns River

Site information
- Condition: Only traces remain

Location
- Location of Fort Picolata Fort Picolata (the United States)
- Coordinates: 29°55′23″N 81°36′03″W
- Height: 32 ft.

Site history
- Built: 1734, rebuilt 1755
- Built by: Spanish Army (Ejército de Tierra)
- In use: 1740
- Materials: Originally pine log palisade and blockhouse, rebuilt with coquina shell rock
- Events: Burned by Indian allies of James Oglethorpe in 1740

Garrison information
- Garrison: Spanish Army troops (1700s); U.S. Army troops (1800s)

Fort Picolata (Spanish: Fuerte Picolata) was an 18th-century Spanish fort on the east bank of the St. Johns River, about eighteen miles from St. Augustine (San Agustín), the capital of Spanish Florida (La Florida). Lying on the old trail to the Spanish province of Apalachee in western Florida, Fort Picolata and its sister outpost, Fort San Francisco de Pupo, controlled all traffic at the ferry crossing where the river narrows considerably. This natural pass was called "Salamatoto" by the Indians. The first defense works at the site, built soon after 1700 as an outpost of the military defensive network of St. Augustine, were little more than a sentry box surrounded by a palisade. According to the archaeologist Carl D. Halbirt, fort Picolata and fort San Francisco de Pupo were "hexagonal wooden towers 16 ft. high and enclosed by a hexagram palisade", but they were "dilapidated" by 1737. Both forts were rebuilt somewhat more substantially in 1738 as 30-ft. high by 16-ft. square wooden towers with machicolation enclosed in an 8-ft. high palisade. They were destroyed in the War of Jenkins' Ear (1739–1744). Fort Picolata was rebuilt in 1755 as a coquina stone tower 2½ stories high and enclosed by a palisade.

== History ==
Tensions had been growing between the Spanish and the British after James Moore, the governor of Carolina, invaded La Florida in 1704 and 1706. Fort Picolata, along with Fort Pupo on the opposite side of the St. Johns, was built in 1734 by order of Governor Francisco del Moral y Sánchez in anticipation of more attacks by the English and their Indian allies.

When Gen. Oglethorpe, the governor of the British Province of Georgia, invaded Florida in late December 1739 and early January 1740 with his force of Scottish Highlanders and Indian allies, the Indians captured and burned Fort Picolata; Oglethorpe then laid siege to St. Augustine. The Spanish rebuilt the fort in 1755. Coquina stone for building the fortification was transported to the river crossing at Picolata, where the El Camino Real (The Royal Road) to the interior crossed the St. Johns River. There is no historical record that its sister fort, Fort San Francisco de Pupo, was ever rebuilt by the Spanish.

In a letter to the Spanish king Philip V dated January 31, 1740 (O.S.), Governor Montiano wrote that forts Picalata [sic] and Pupo "were constructed solely for the purpose of defending and sheltering from the continual attacks of Indian allies of the English, the mails that go to and come from Apalachee." When the British acquired Florida after the signing of the Treaty of Paris in 1763, they soon recognized the value of Fort Picolata as part of the defenses of St. Augustine, and continued to maintain a garrison there as the Spanish had done. Important congresses between British colonial officials and the Indians took place at Picolata in 1765 and 1767.

The first Picolata Conference, held November 15–18, 1765, between British officials and a delegation of Lower Creek and Seminole leaders, was organized by John Stuart, Indian superintendent of the Southern Department, and summoned by Governor James Grant, to negotiate the boundaries between Indian and British lands. A treaty was signed at the congress, by which the Indians ceded over two million acres of land in northeast Florida to the British, stretching thirty-five miles from the coast westward past the St. Johns, and including all the tidewater land on the rest of the peninsula, extending up to ten miles inland from the coast. The conference was attended by the American botanist and explorer John Bartram and his son William.

In his Travels, William Bartram wrote that he had visited Fort Picolata in April, 1774, and found it "dismantled and deserted". This is not what actually occurred; the misstatement may be attributed to the fact that it had been 18 years between his visit and the publication of his journal in 1792. In a report made in 1774 to his patron, Dr. John Fothergill (Fothergill was the agent in England for William's father, John Bartram), Bartram wrote that he had stopped "at Picolata Fort. which I observed was newly repared [sic]."

In his memoirs, then first-lieutenant William T. Sherman notes being stationed at Picolata during the Second Seminole War, between 1841-1842. He stated that, at that time, Picolata consisted of two buildings, one "which had been built for a hospital, and the dwelling of a family named Williams."
