= Old Swedes' Church =

Old Swedes' Church may refer to:

- Holy Trinity Church (Old Swedes) in Wilmington, Delaware
- Gloria Dei (Old Swedes') Church in Philadelphia, Pennsylvania
- St. James Kingsessing in Philadelphia, Pennsylvania is often called "Old Swedes"
- Trinity Church (Old Swedes' Church) in Swedesboro, New Jersey
