= William Bartram (Pennsylvania politician) =

Quaker politician and settler (1674–1711)

Member of the Pennsylvania Provincial Assembly from Chester County
- In office 1708

Personal details
- Born: 1674 Ashbourne, Derbyshire, England
- Died: September 22, 1711 (aged 36–37) near Bogue Sound, Province of Carolina, British America
- Spouses: Elizabeth Hunt (m. 1696; died 1701) Elizabeth Smith (m. 1707)
- Children: John; James; Elizabeth; William
- Parent: John Bartram (father)
- Relatives: William Bartram (grandson)

William Bartram (1674 – September 22, 1711) was an English-born Quaker politician and settler who was a member of the Pennsylvania Provincial Assembly from Chester County in 1708. After settling in the Province of Carolina, he was killed in present-day North Carolina during the Tuscarora War in 1711. Bartram was the grandfather of the naturalist of the same name.

== Biography ==
William Bartram was born in Ashbourne, Derbyshire, England, in 1674 to John Bartram and his wife Elizabeth. William emigrated with his family to the Province of Pennsylvania about 1683, when he was around the age of 9. He first married Elizabeth Hunt, the daughter of James Hunt of Kingsessing, on May 22, 1696. His first son John was born on June 3, 1699. (Note: Many sources incorrectly have John's date of birth as March 23, 1699, as the record of the Darby monthly meeting "23 Third Month 1699" uses the Old Style.) His second son James was born on October 6, 1701. His first wife died two weeks later on October 21, 1701. Bartram and Elizabeth Smith declared their intent to marry on September 14, 1707, in Darby, Pennsylvania. Following in his father's footsteps, Bartram was chosen to be a member of the Pennsylvania Provincial Assembly and represented Chester County in 1708. Bartram purchased 840 acres on Bogue Sound near present-day Swansboro, North Carolina, in 1709. His daughter Elizabeth and son William were recorded as being born in Darby. Although some incorrect sources say his son William was born in Carteret County, North Carolina. John and James, his children with his first wife, were left to be raised by their grandfather James Hunt of Kingsessing. Bartram settled at Whitoc Plantation in North Carolina on the Cape Fear River or the White Oak River.

=== Death ===
Bartram was killed during the Tuscarora War on September 22, 1711, and his wife and two children were captured by Native Americans. They were held as captives until they were ransomed by relatives from Philadelphia and moved to Pennsylvania.

== Family ==
While his family is known for their work in the field of botany, his sons John and William are also notable as some of the few Quakers who were involved with slavery in the United States. After his death, his son John remained in Pennsylvania but William later returned to North Carolina to take care of his father's estate, after Native Americans had been removed from the area, where he established a plantation known as Ashwood and was a member of the colonial legislature for many years. Ashwood was a very large rice plantation with a large slave labor force by the mid-eighteenth century. William Bartram the emigrant was the grandfather of the naturalist.

- Children with Elizabeth Hunt (1677 – October 21, 1701)
  - John Bartram (June 3, 1699 – September 22, 1777)
  - James Bartram (October 6, 1701 – 1771)
- Children with Elizabeth Smith (March 17, 1689 – 1735)
  - Elizabeth Bartram (February 21, 1710 – January 15, 1732)
  - William Bartram (June 14, 1711 – October 24, 1770)

== Bibliography ==
- Lee, Francis Bazley (1910). Genealogical and Memorial History of the State of New Jersey. Vol. III. New York: Lewis Historical Publishing Company. pp. 989–990.
