= Regent-Rennoc Court =

- U.S. National Register of Historic Places
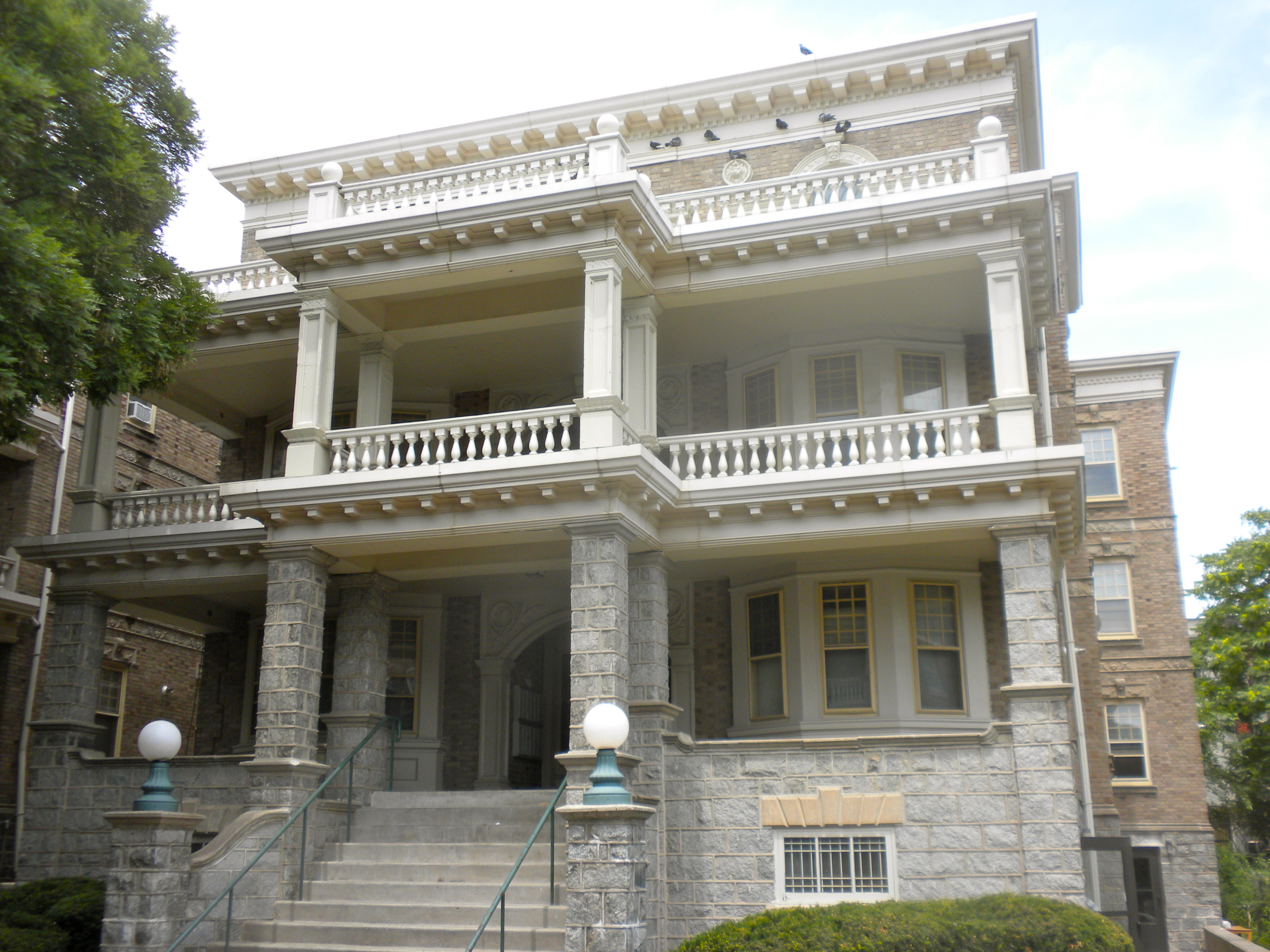
- Regent-Rennoc Court, June 2010

- Location within Philadelphia Location within Pennsylvania Location within the United States
- Location: 5100 blk. Regent St. & 1311--1327 S. 52nd St., Philadelphia, Pennsylvania
- Coordinates: 39°56′28″N 75°13′6″W
- Area: 1 acre (0.40 ha)
- Built: 1910
- Built by: Conner, James
- Architect: Wilson, E.A.
- Architectural style: Renaissance
- NRHP reference No.: 85002292
- Added to NRHP: September 12, 1985

Regent-Rennoc Court is an historic apartment complex in the Southwest Schuylkill neighborhood of Philadelphia, Pennsylvania, United States.

It was added to the National Register of Historic Places in 1985.

== History and architectural features ==
This complex consists of nine buildings that were erected in 1910. Designed in the Renaissance Revival style, they are large, six-unit buildings that are arranged in groups of three on either side of Regent Street. Three-story buildings, they are brick structures that sit on Wissahickon schist foundations and feature projecting arched center entrances and multiple porch levels.
