= Camellia lucii =

Scientific classification
- Kingdom: Plantae
- Clade: Tracheophytes
- Clade: Angiosperms
- Clade: Eudicots
- Clade: Asterids
- Order: Ericales
- Family: Theaceae
- Genus: Camellia
- Species: C. lucii

Binomial name
- Camellia lucii Orel & Curry
- It is endemic to Vietnam, but is now extinct in the wild

Species of tree

Camellia lucii is a species of plant in the family Theaceae endemic to Vietnam. It is extinct in the wild and is only known from cultivation.

== Description ==
Camellia lucii is a small, flowering tree that strongly resembles C. amplexicaulis, but has white flowers. It can also be distinguished from C. amplexicaulis by the shape of the flowers, styles, and fruit, as well as by the surface of mature leaves.

== Taxonomy ==
It was described by George Orel and Anthony S. Curry in 2015. Camellia lucii was first noticed by scientists in 1999 at a commercial nursery in Hanoi. It was stated that the specimen was collected in the mountains near the city. In 2001, cuttings were taken from the specimen and grafted onto Camellia amplexicaulis rootstocks in Kulnura, Australia. Additional plants were propagated, and in 2015 the species was formally described. The type specimen was collected from a private collection in Hanoi, Vietnam by G. Orel, A. S. Curry, A. Luc, and G. Richards on the 3 April 2001.

=== Etymology ===
The species epithet is named for André Luc, an expert in Camellia.

== Distribution and habitat ==
It is endemic to Vietnam.

== Conservation ==
Camellia lucii is extinct in the wild and only persists in cultivation. It is cultivated in three ex situ conservation collections in botanic gardens, such as in the Arboretum Het Leen and in the Blue Mountains Botanic Garden.
