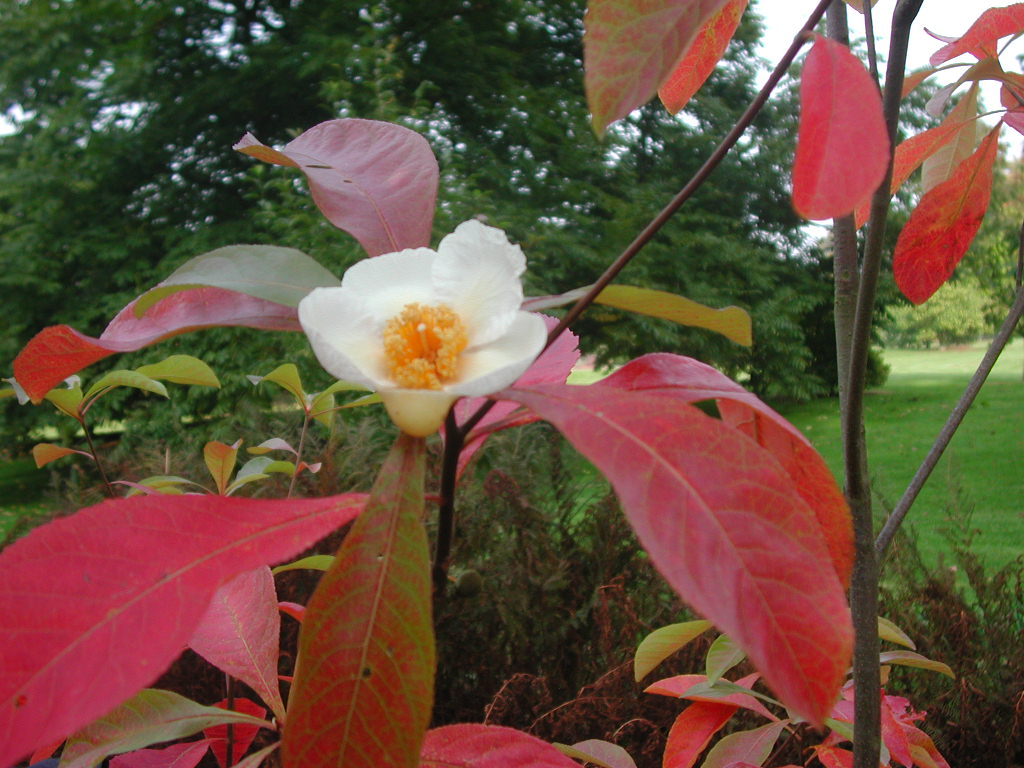
- Flower and leaves in autumn

Conservation status
- Extinct in the Wild (IUCN 3.1)

- Possibly Extinct (NatureServe)

Scientific classification
- Kingdom: Plantae
- Clade: Embryophytes
- Clade: Tracheophytes
- Clade: Angiosperms
- Clade: Eudicots
- Clade: Asterids
- Order: Ericales
- Family: Theaceae
- Genus: Franklinia; W.Bartram ex Marshall
- Species: F. alatamaha

Binomial name
- Franklinia alatamaha Marshall
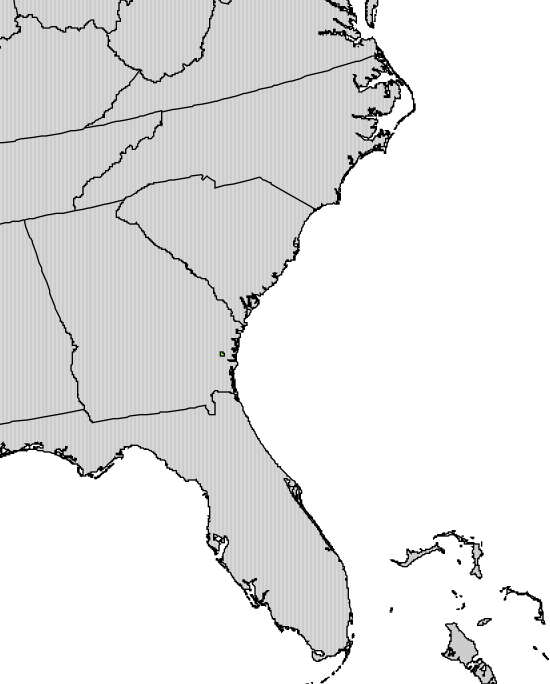
- Natural range

Synonyms
- List: Gordonia alatamaha (Marshall) Sarg.; Gordonia franklinii L'Hér.; Gordonia pubescens L'Hér.; Lacathea florida Salisb.

= Franklinia =

Genus and species of trees

Franklinia is a monotypic genus in the tea family, Theaceae. The sole species in this genus is a flowering tree, Franklinia alatamaha, commonly called Franklinias or the Franklin tree, and native to the Altamaha River valley in Georgia in the southeastern United States. It has been extinct in the wild since the early 19th century, but survives as a cultivated ornamental tree.

In the past, some botanists have included Franklinia within the related genus Gordonia. The southeastern North American species Gordonia lasianthus differs in having evergreen foliage, flowers with longer stems, winged seeds, and conical seed capsules. Franklinia was often known as Gordonia pubescens until the middle of the 20th century.

== Description ==
Franklinia alatamaha is a small deciduous tree or large shrub growing 3 to 10 meters (10 to 33 ft) tall, but commonly 5–7 m (16–23 ft). The tree has a symmetrical, somewhat rounded shape. It frequently suckers and can have one to five trunks. The bark is gray with vertical white striations and has a ridged texture. Although difficult to transplant due to fibrous roots, once established, F. alatamaha can live a century or more.

The leaves attach alternately to the twigs and are clustered towards their ends. They are typically 12–18 centimeters (5–7 in) long, but can sometimes reach a length of 25 cm (10 in). Leaf widths range from 5–9.5 cm (2–4 in), but usually less than 7 cm. The leaves are attached by leaf stems that normally blend into the leaf due to having 1 cm wide wings. Their shape varies from obovate to obtrullate, like a teardrop with the narrowest part towards the base or shaped like a classic mason's trowel but reversed with the narrowest part towards the base. The texture of the leaves is chartaceous, resembling paper or parchment, with an elevated midrib and prominent veins. In the summer their color is bright green, turning orange or red in the fall.

The flowers are fairly large and striking, measuring 7–10 cm (3–4 in) across and somewhat cup shaped. They are solitary and each has five creamy–white petals surrounding golden-yellow stamens.

The seed capsules require 12–14 months to mature. Unlike almost all angiosperms, Franklinia alatamaha exhibits zygotic dormancy. It pollinates in late summer or early autumn, is then dormant over winter, and only sets fruit during the subsequent summer. Female gametophytes are mature prior to pollination, with double fertilization occurring soon after pollination. The zygote becomes dormant immediately after fertilization with delay of development until the following summer. Initial development of endosperm occurs for up to 3 months after fertilization but comes to a standstill at winter's onset. With onset of the following summer, embryogenesis begins and endosperm development restarts. This overwinter zygotic dormancy is extremely rare among temperate angiosperms.

== Taxonomy ==
Franklinia is thought to be closer in relation to the Asian genus Schima than to Gordonia. Recent DNA studies and examinations of floral ontogeny in the Theaceae place Franklinia together with Gordonia and Schima in a subtribe. Hybrid crosses have been produced between Franklinia alatamaha and Gordonia lasianthus, and between Franklinia alatamaha and Schima argentea.

=== History ===
"No tree which ornaments our gardens has a more romantic history," begins a lengthy 1933 article published in The Pennsylvania Magazine of History and Biography. The history of Franklinia's discovery in coastal Georgia, followed by disappearance in the wild, and saved only by its ability to grow, flower, and seed in the Philadelphia garden of its initial collector entail the main thread of the unusual botanical history.

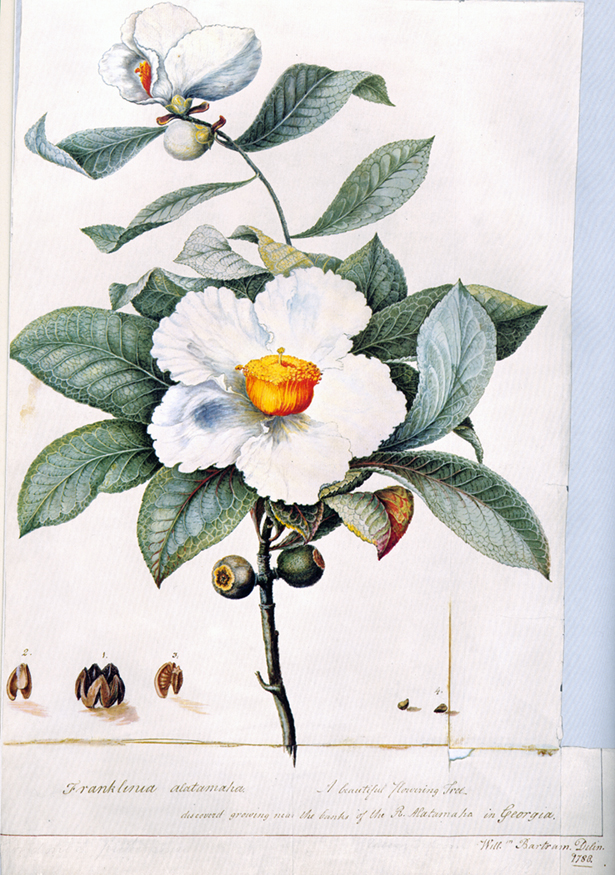
Franklinia alatamaha by William Bartram (1782)

Philadelphia botanists John and William Bartram first observed the tree growing along the Altamaha River near Fort Barrington in the British colony the Province of Georgia, around 15 miles (24 km) south of Louis LeConte's Botanical Gardens, in October 1765. John Bartram recorded "severall very curious shrubs" in his journal entry for October 1, 1765. William Bartram returned several times to the same location on the Altamaha during a collecting trip to the American South, funded by Dr. John Fothergill of London. William Bartram collected Franklinia seeds during this extended trip to the South from 1773 through 1776, a journey described in his book Bartram's Travels published in Philadelphia in 1791. William Bartram brought seed back to Philadelphia in 1777 at which time William reported to his father that he had relocated the plant, but this time had been able to retrieve its seeds although it was not until after John's death (1777) that he was able to achieve flowering plants (1781). After several years of study, William Bartram assigned the "rare and elegant flowering shrub" to a new genus Franklinia, named in honor of his father's great friend Benjamin Franklin. The new plant name, Franklinia alatamaha, was first published by a Bartram cousin, Humphry Marshall, in 1785 in his catalogue of North American trees and shrubs titled Arbustrum Americanum.

William Bartram was the first to report the extremely limited distribution of Franklinia. "We never saw it grow in any other place, nor have I ever since seen it growing wild, in all my travels, from Pennsylvania to Point Coupe, on the banks of the Mississippi, which must be allowed a very singular and unaccountable circumstance; at this place there are two or three acres (twelve thousand square meters) of ground where it grows plentifully." After returning to Georgia after the American Revolution, Bartram was unable to find the trees.

The tree was last verified in the wild in 1803 by the English plant collector John Lyon (although there are hints it may have been present into at least the 1840s). The cause of its extinction in the wild is not known, but has been attributed to a number of causes including fire, flood, overcollection by plant collectors, and fungal disease introduced with the cultivation of cotton plants.

All the Franklin trees known to exist today are descended from seed collected by William Bartram and propagated at Bartram's Garden in Philadelphia. The John Bartram Association undertook a search for trees from 1998 to 2000 and located more than 2,000 specimens growing worldwide. The greatest number were reported to them from Pennsylvania, North Carolina, and New Jersey. At that time there were trees in 36 states and eight countries. DNA evidence supports that more than one tree was sampled by Bartram during his original collection in Georgia and the diversity was maintained over the years. To mark the 300th anniversary of John Bartram's birth in 1998, Bartram's Garden launched a project to locate as many Franklinia trees as possible.

=== Synonyms ===
The genus has one synonym, Lacathea, published by Richard Anthony Salisbury in 1806. The species Franklinia alatamaha has 6 botanical synonyms.

Table of Synonyms
Name	Year	Rank	Notes
Gordonia alatamaha (Marshall) Sarg.	1889	species	≡ hom.
Gordonia franklinii L'Hér.	1791	species	≡ hom., nom. superfl.
Gordonia pubescens L'Hér.	1791	species	= het., nom. illeg.
Gordonia pubescens var. subglabra DC.	1824	variety	= het.
Gordonia pubescens var. velutina DC.	1824	variety	= het.
Lacathea florida Salisb.	1806	species	= het.
Notes: ≡ homotypic synonym; = heterotypic synonym

=== Names ===
Marshal coined the specific name, alatamaha, as a Botanical Latin form of the Altamaha River where it was collected by Bartram. The genus name, Franklinia, is also used in the nursery trade as a common name for the species, though it is also known as the Franklin tree.

== Status as a glacial relict ==
There have been efforts to reintroduce the species to its native habitat. Twenty-four individuals were planted between 2002 and 2003 in the Altamaha Wildlife Management Area; however, they were unsuccessful. The idea of reintroduction was long controversial for some plant enthusiasts who believed wild populations may still exist.

In eastern North America, lowland glacial refuges along the Atlantic and Gulf Coasts host endemic plants — some of which are rare, even endangered, and others entail the most southerly disjunct populations of plants that commonly appear only hundreds of miles to the north.

Joel Fry, a curator at Bartram's Garden botanical garden which continues to host Franklinia since the late 18th century, speculates that the population discovered was a relic of a larger range that reached out onto a coastal plain that was drowned by rising sea levels at the end of the most recent glacial maximum. Unlike other plants, the Franklinia failed to migrate back to the north as the Holocene warmed and was trapped in a small area of favorable conditions. Supporting the idea of it being a relic of a much more extensive population are the fossils of Franklinia from the Pliocene found in both Europe and in Asia.

== Cultivation ==
Franklinias are a desirable understory plant for their large Camellia-like flowers and bright fall color. However, it also requires a site in full sun to produce a good display of fall color and flowers. The Franklin tree has a reputation among gardeners for being difficult to cultivate, especially in urban environments. It prefers sandy, high-acid soil, and does not tolerate compacted clay soil, excessive moisture, or any disturbance to its roots. The Franklin tree has no known pests, but it is subject to root-rot and crown-rot caused by Phytophthora cinnamomi and does not endure drought well. It is commercially available for garden cultivation.

It is one of two species of trees in the tea family that only exists in cultivation, the other being Camellia amplexicaulis.

== Gallery ==
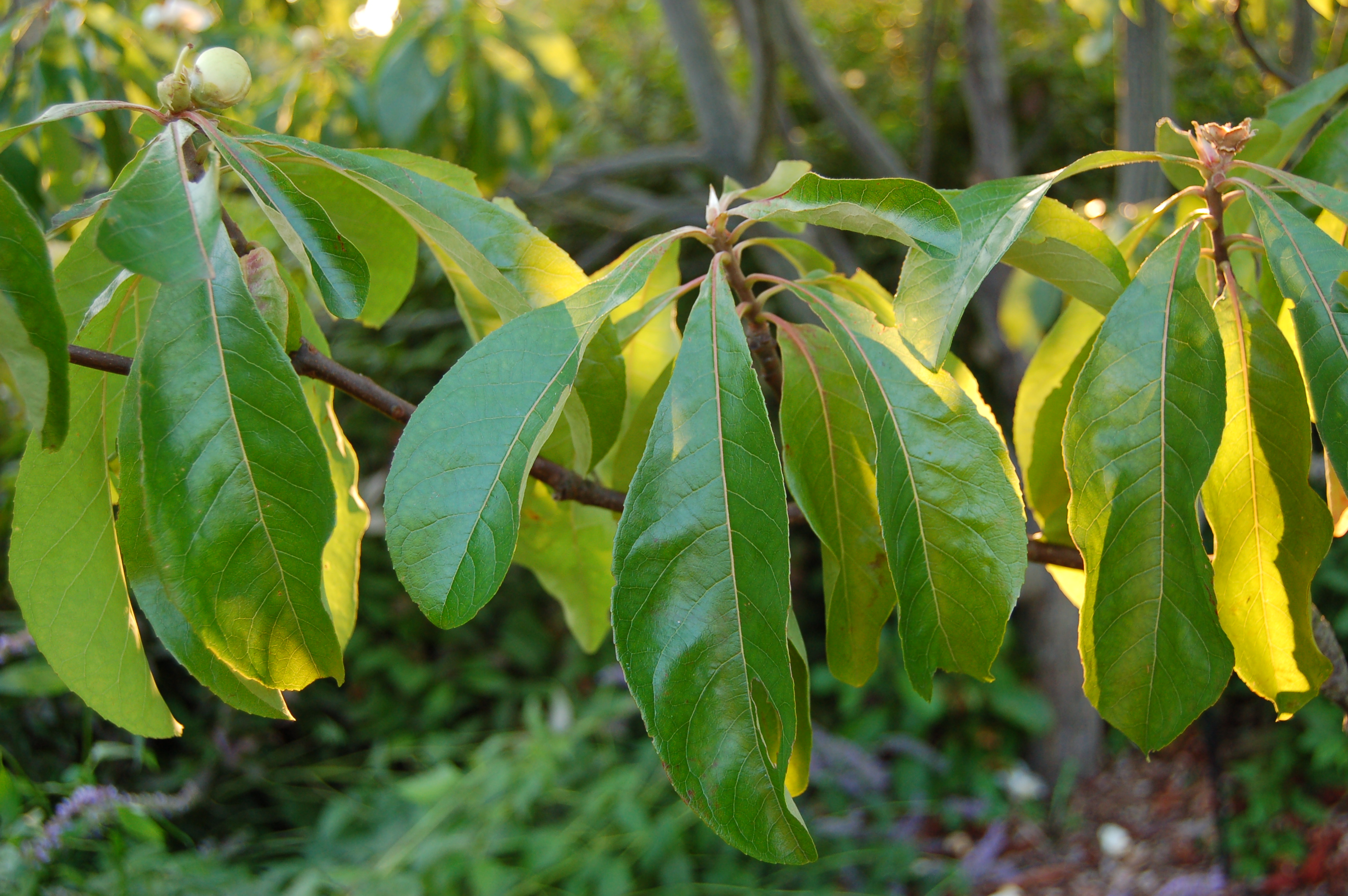
Leaves

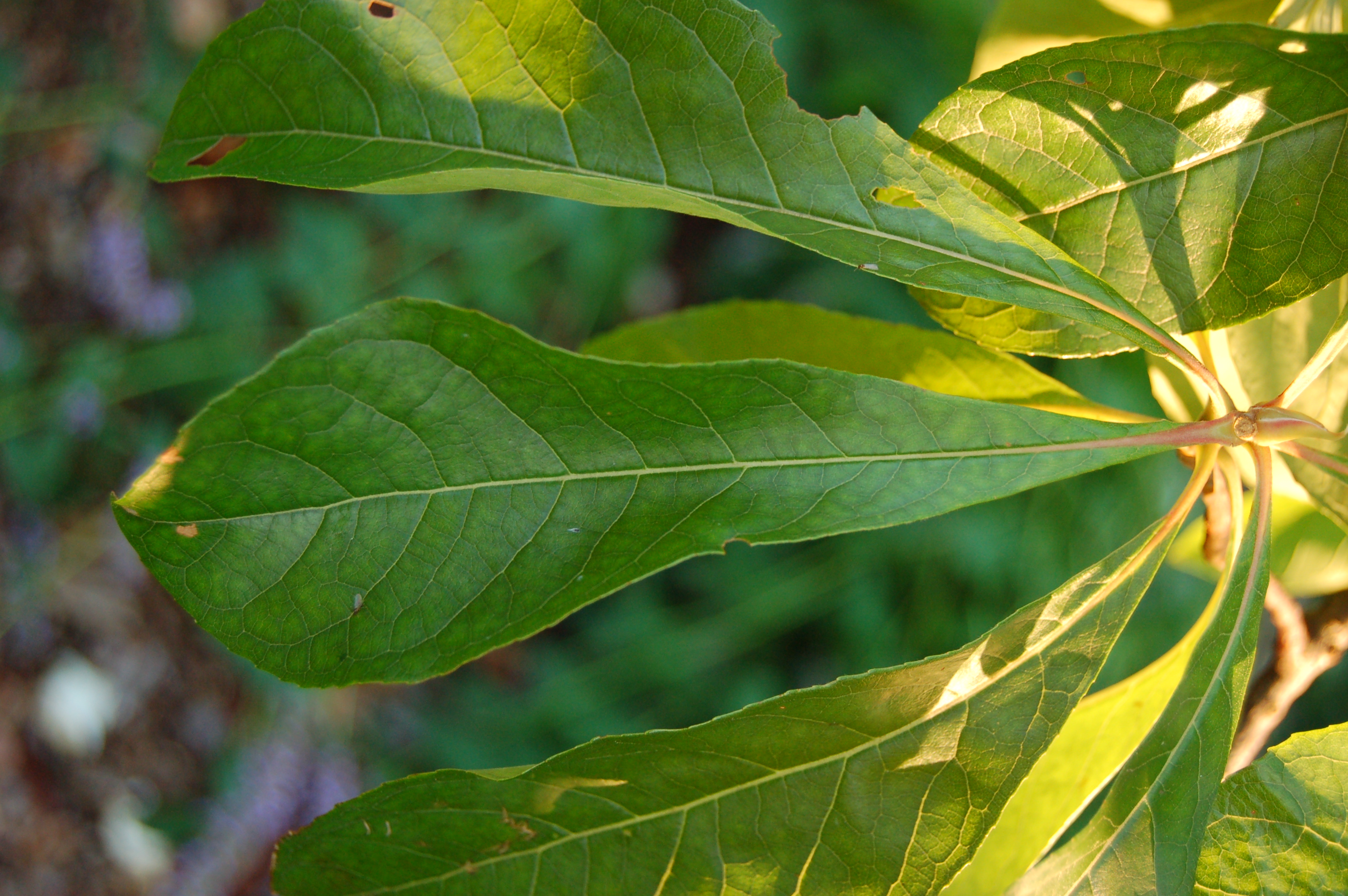
Leaf closeup

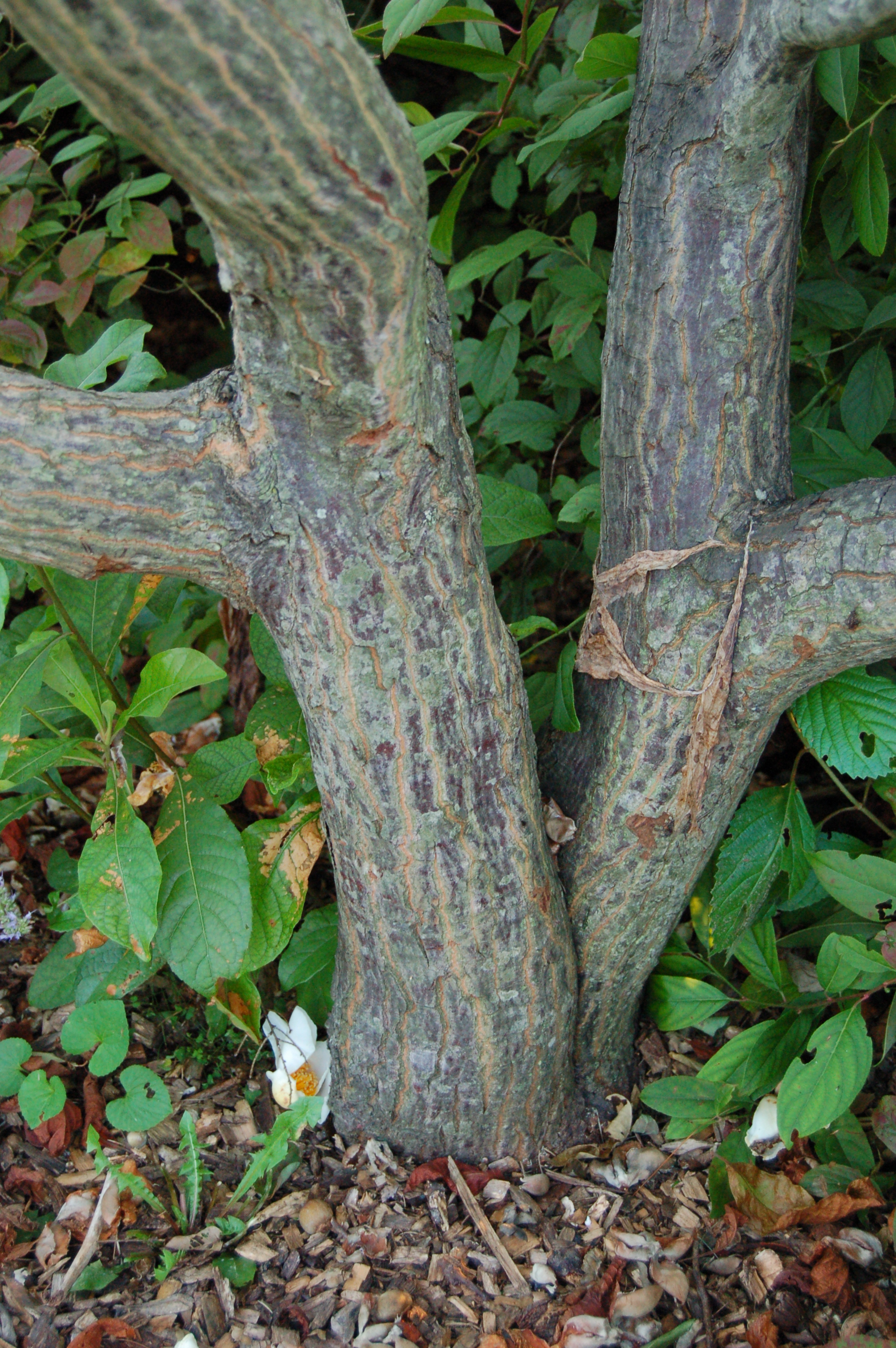
Trunk bark

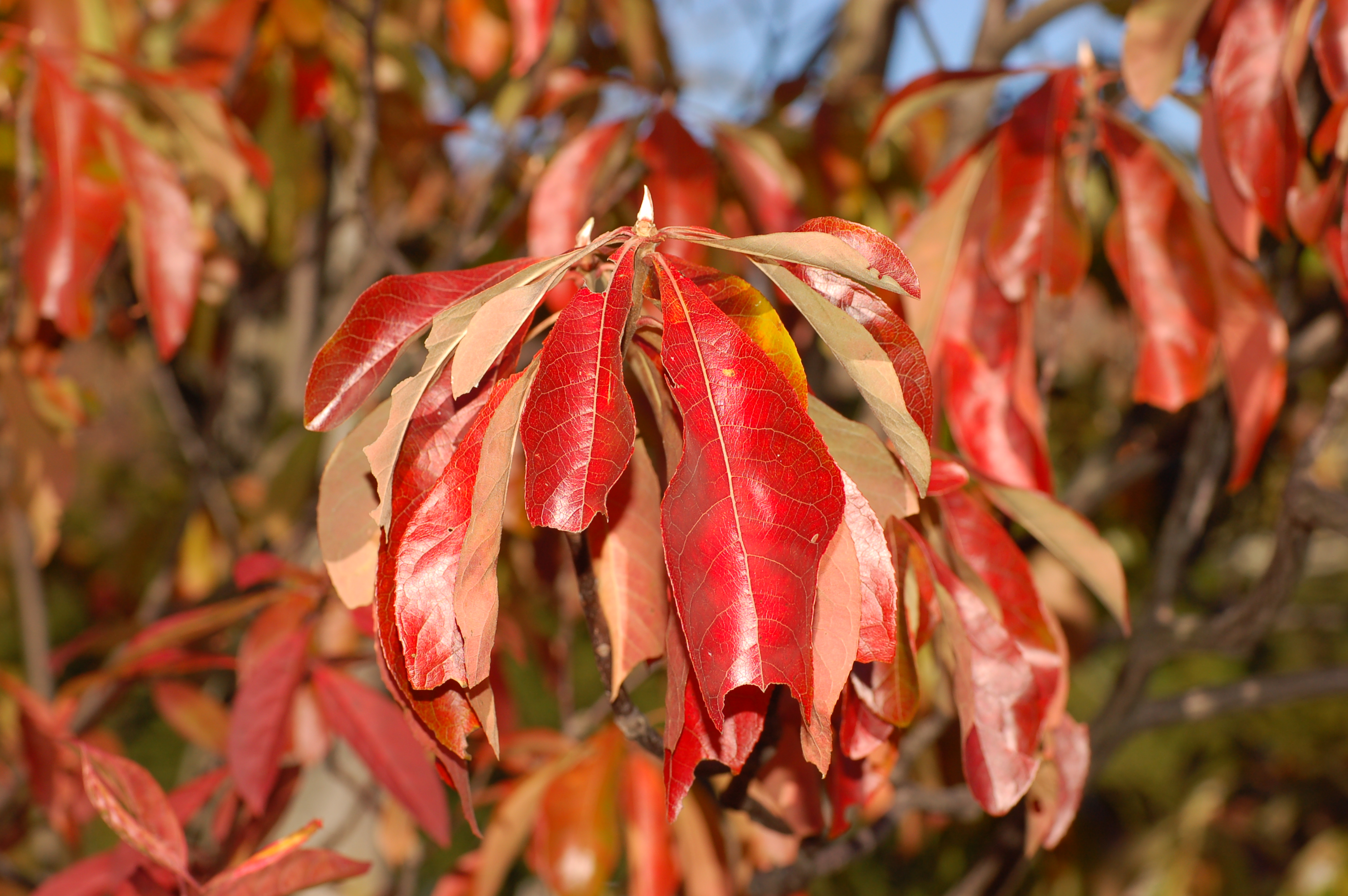
Fall leaves

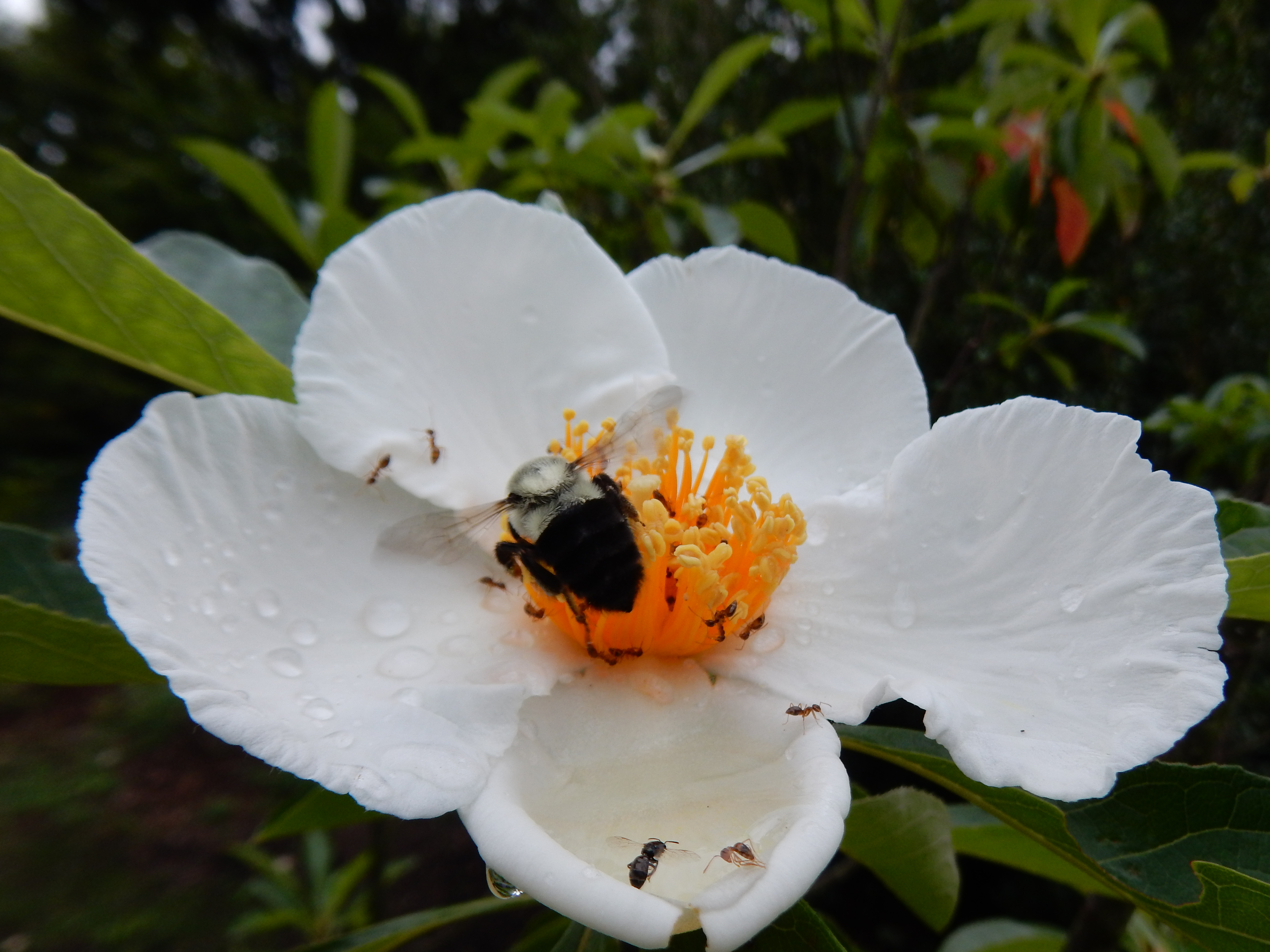
Flower

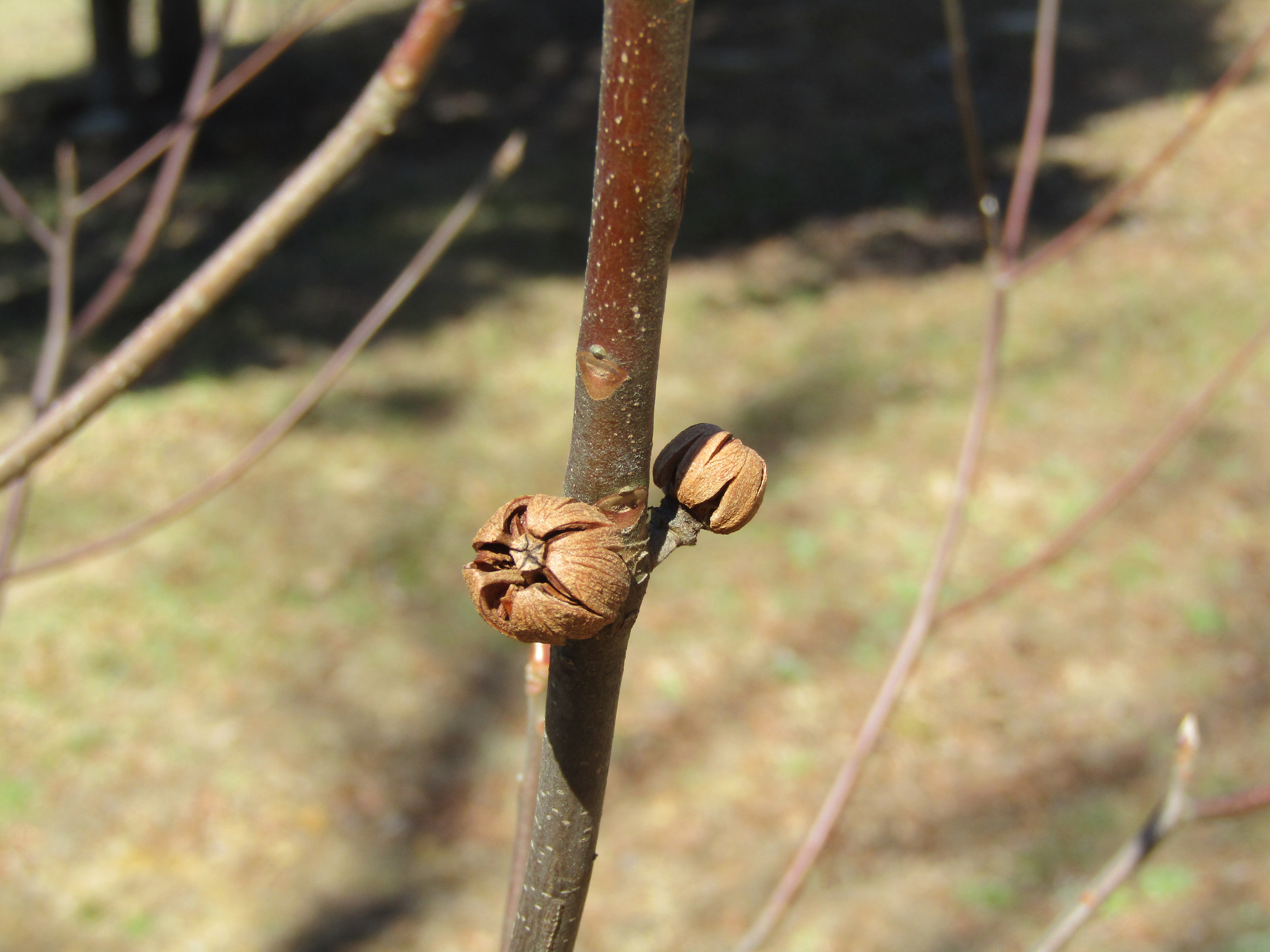
Fruit capsule
