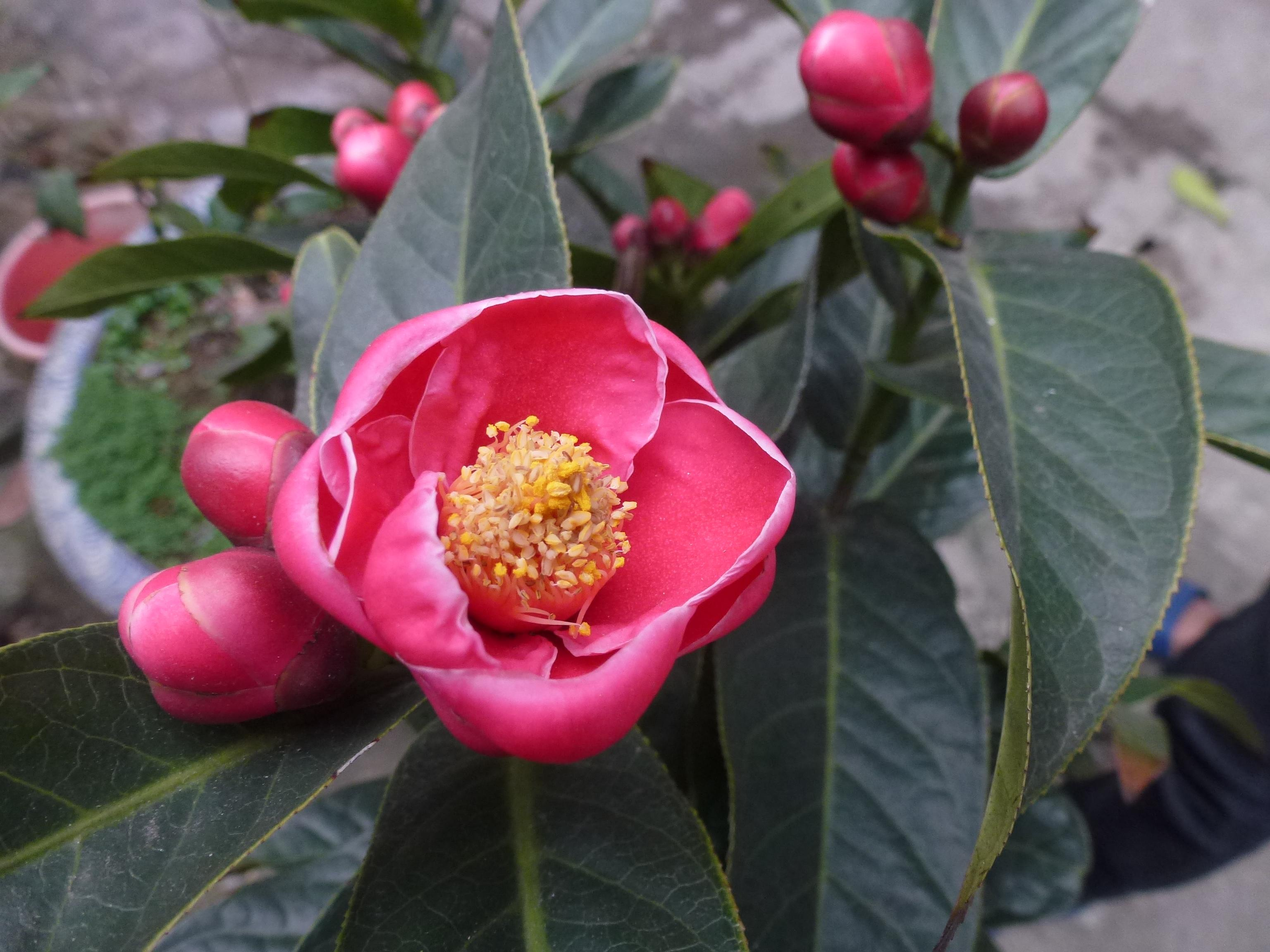
- Flower and leaves

Conservation status
- Extinct in the Wild (IUCN 3.1)

Scientific classification
- Kingdom: Plantae
- Clade: Tracheophytes
- Clade: Angiosperms
- Clade: Eudicots
- Clade: Asterids
- Order: Ericales
- Family: Theaceae
- Genus: Camellia
- Species: C. amplexicaulis

Binomial name
- Camellia amplexicaulis (Pit.) Cohen-Stuart

Synonyms
- Thea amplexicaulis Pit.

= Camellia amplexicaulis =

Species of tree

Camellia amplexicaulis is a species of flowering tree in the tea family. Originally native to Vietnam, it has been considered extinct in the wild since 2018. It is one of two species of trees in the tea family that only exists in cultivation, the other being Franklinia. It is known in Vietnam as Hải đường.

The species was first collected in 1910 in the Tam Đảo region of northern Vietnam. Its habitat was likely tropical and sub-tropical evergreen forests. Although extinct in the wild, it is commonly cultivated in Vietnam and flowers are utilized during the Tết festival.

== Description ==
C. amplexicaulis is highly variable in cultivation. The species is a small tree that may grow between 2 and 4 meters tall. Leaves are evergreen, glossy, and clasp the stem. Flowers are pink and emerge in late autumn to early spring. Fruit is round and shiny.

Four species were split from Camellia amplexicaulis, including the white-flowered Camellia lucii in 2015. Camellia ingens, Camellia pyriparva and Camellia scabrosa were described in 2017.
