= William Bertram =

William Bertram may refer to:

- William Bertram (MP), in 1431, MP for Northumberland Warden and Governor of Channel Islands 1447
- William Bertram (actor) (1880–1933), Canadian-born actor and film director
- William Bertram (cricketer) (1883–1959), South African cricketer
- William Bertram (politician) (1875–1957), Australian politician
- Billy Bertram (1897–1962), English footballer

== See also ==
- William Bartram (disambiguation)
- Bertram (surname)
