= John Bartram (politician) =

Quaker politician (c. 1650–1697)

Member of the Pennsylvania Provincial Assembly from Chester County
- In office 1689

Personal details
- Born: c. 1650 England
- Died: 12 December 1697 (Note: It is sometimes written that he died on 1 September 1697. This is due to the record of his death from the Darby Monthly Meeting, reading "John Bartram deceased the 1st day of the 9th month 1697 and was bured in the burings places in Darby", which uses the Old Style. See Old Style and New Style dates.) Darby, Province of Pennsylvania
- Spouse: Elizabeth
- Children: John; Isaac; William; Mary; Elizabeth
- Relatives: John Bartram (grandson); William Bartram (grandson)

John Bartram (c.1650 – 12 December 1697) was an English Quaker politician who was a member of the Pennsylvania Provincial Assembly from Chester County in 1689. He was born in England and emigrated to the Province of Pennsylvania, where he settled and owned many acres of land in what is now Delaware County, Pennsylvania. He was the grandfather of the botanist John Bartram.

== Biography ==
John Bartram, son of Richard Bartram, was married in Derbyshire, England, and lived in Ashbourne, Derbyshire, where he and his wife had one daughter and three sons. The family removed to the Province of Pennsylvania in 1682 or 1683 with his wife and four children. On 8 July 1684 his daughter Elizabeth was born. Bartram settled on the western side of Darby Creek, just above the village of Darby. The three hundred acres of land were surveyed to him on 30 August 1685.

On 19 August 1688, it was agreed that the Darby "Meeting House be lined within" and on 27 October 1688, "Thomas Hood and John Bartram ordered to gather the money for ye Glase and Speake for it". Bartram was a member of the Pennsylvania Provincial Assembly from Chester County in 1689. He died on 12 December 1697.

== Bibliography ==
- Darlington, William (1849). Memorials of John Bartram and Humphry Marshall. With Notices of Their Botanical Contemporaries. Philadelphia: Lindsay & Blakiston.
- Wiley, Samuel T. (1893). Garner, Winfield Scott (ed.). Biographical and Portrait Cyclopedia of Chester County, Pennsylvania, Comprising a Historical Sketch of the County, Together With More Than Five Hundred Biographical Sketches of Prominent Men and Leading Citizens of the County. Richmond, Indiana: Gresham Publishing Company.
- Lee, Francis Bazley (1910). Genealogical and Memorial History of the State of New Jersey. Vol. III. New York: Lewis Historical Publishing Company.
- Jordan, John Woolf (1914). A History of Delaware County Pennsylvania and Its People. Vol. II. New York: Lewis Historical Publishing Company.
- Robeson, Susan Stroud; Stroud, Caroline Franciscus (1916). Osborne, Kate Hamilton (ed.). An Historical and Genealogical Account of Andrew Robeson, of Scotland, New Jersey and Pennsylvania, and of His Descendants from 1653 to 1916. Philadelphia: Kate Hamilton Osborne; Press of J. B. Lippincott Company.
