= Bartram Canoe Trail =

Alabamian water trail

The Bartram Canoe Trail is a system of canoe and kayak water trails in the Mobile–Tensaw River Delta of Alabama.

Named for explorer and naturalist William Bartram, the 200-mile-long trail system is one of the longest in the United States. It includes bottomland hardwood swamp, creeks, side channel sloughs, lakes and backwaters. The system also includes Bottle Creek which is near the Bottle Creek Indian Mounds.

The trail system is operated by the Alabama Department of Conservation and Natural Resources.

== Features ==
| Point | Coordinates (links to map & photo sources) |
|---|---|
| Boatyard Landing | 31.1768°N 87.84068°W |
| Canal Island Platform Campsite | 31.08983°N 87.89123°W |
| Champion Cypress Tree | 31.001028°N 87.911472°W (Note: 200 yards @ 206 degrees from tree on bank marked "5" in blue) |
| Dead Lake Platform Campsite | 31.0439°N 87.9155°W |
| French's Lake | 31.13568°N 87.84518°W |
| Holley Creek | 31.1824°N 87.85417°W |
| Hubbard's Landing | 31.0637°N 87.87028°W |
| Jacintoport Campsite | 30.82159705°N 88.04618424°W |
| Jug Lake Platform Campsite | 31.01173365°N 87.90813999°W |
| Rice Creek Landing | 31.01578°N 87.8636°W |
| Spoonbill Sandbar Campsite | 31.16797°N 87.89384°W |
| Two Rivers Point Campsite | 31.01968°N 87.96262°W |
| Upper Bryant Landing | 31.04437°N 87.87635°W |
