= St. James Kingsessing =

Church in Philadelphia

- St. James Kingsessing Episcopal Church
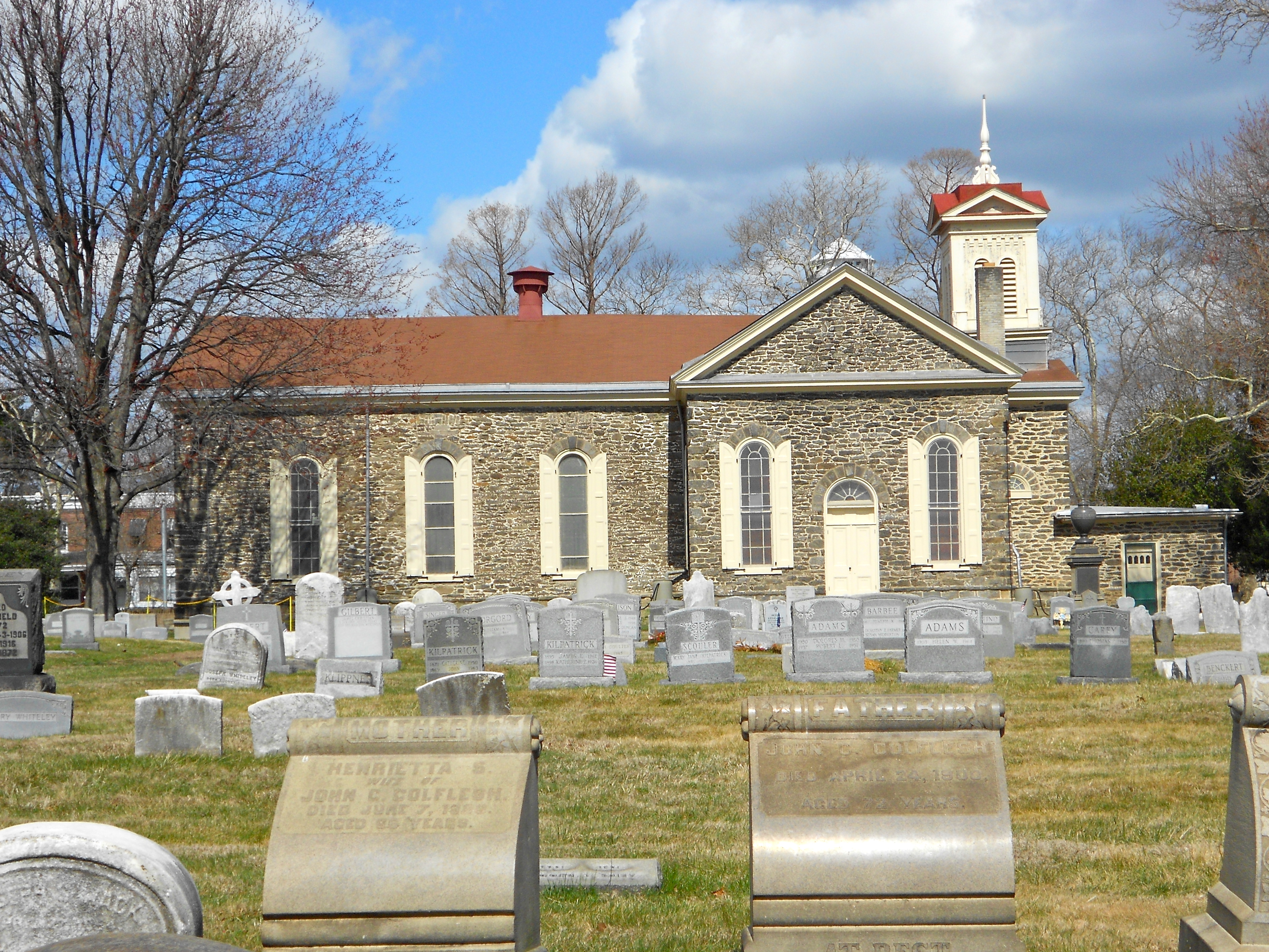

- Location within Pennsylvania Location within the United States
- 39.922136°N 75.239052°W
- Location: 6838 Woodland Ave; Philadelphia, Pennsylvania 19142
- Country: United States
- Denomination: Episcopal
- Website: stjameskingsessing.org

St. James Kingsessing, commonly called "Old Swedes", is an historic church located at 68th Street and Woodland Avenue in the Kingsessing neighborhood of Philadelphia, Pennsylvania, United States. It is one of the churches created by settlers and descendants of the Delaware Valley colony of New Sweden, a colony planted by the Swedish South Company that existed from 1638 and 1655, when it was conquered by the Dutch. St. James, built in 1762, is a sister congregation to the old Swedish church of Gloria Dei in the Southwark neighborhood of Philadelphia. The church was founded by a Lutheran congregation and is now part of the Episcopal Diocese of Pennsylvania.

The church reported 221 members in 2018 and 76 members in 2023; no membership statistics were reported in 2024 Episcopal Church parochial reports. Plate and pledge income reported for the congregation in 2024 was $57,924. Average Sunday attendance (ASA) in 2024 was 58 persons.
