= William Bartram =

American naturalist (1739–1823)

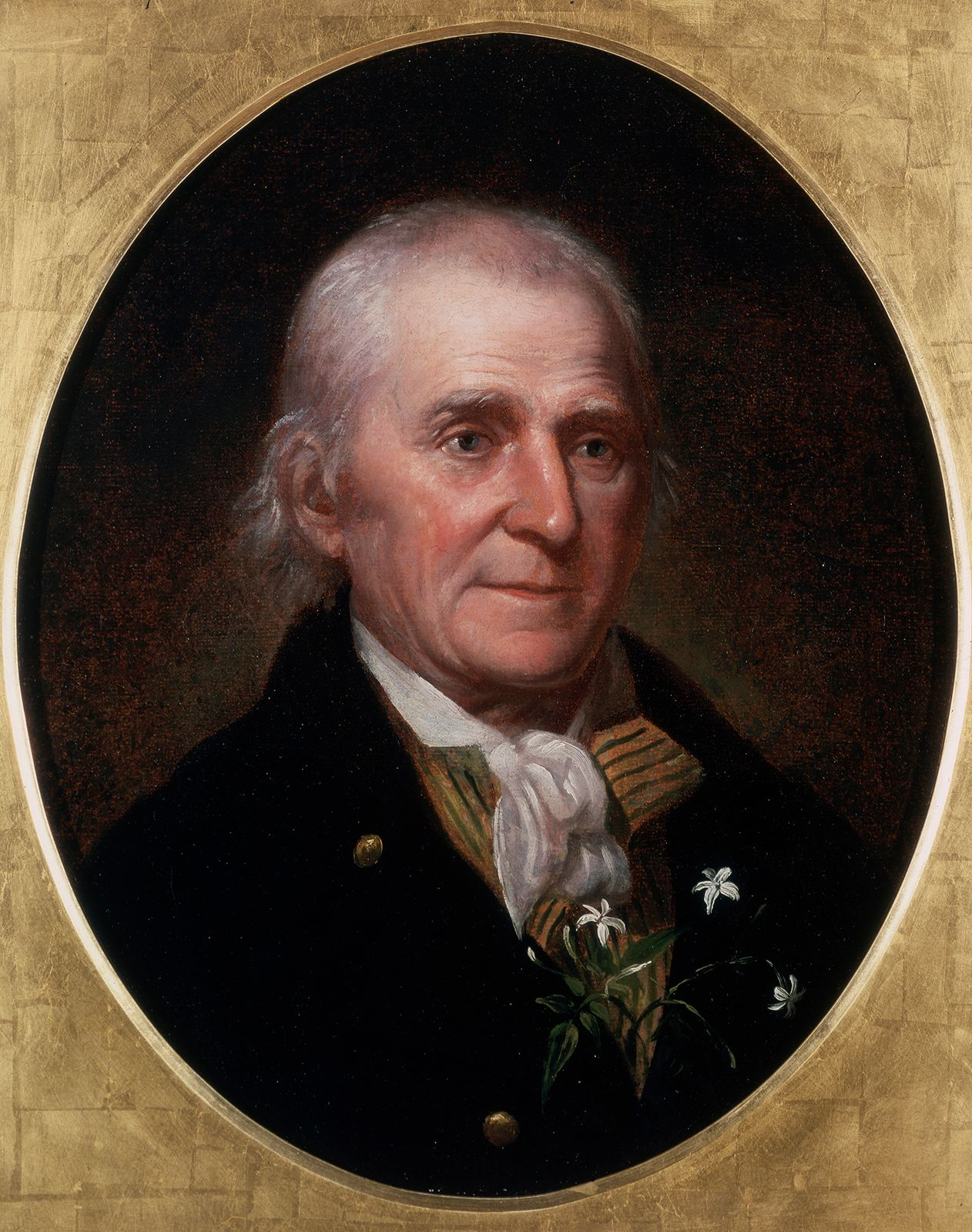
- Portrait by Charles Willson Peale, c. 1808
- Born: April 20, 1739; Kingsessing, Philadelphia, Province of Pennsylvania
- Died: July 22, 1823 (aged 84); Kingsessing, Philadelphia, Pennsylvania, U.S.
- Known for: Bartram's Travels
- Parents: John Bartram (father); Ann Mendenhall (mother)
- Relatives: William Bartram (grandfather); William Bartram (uncle)
- Scientific career
- Fields: Botany; ornithology; natural history
- Author abbrev. (botany): W.Bartram

William Bartram (April 20, 1739 – July 22, 1823) was an American naturalist, writer and explorer. Bartram was the author of an acclaimed book, now known by the shortened title Bartram's Travels, which chronicled his explorations of the Southern Colonies of North America from 1773 to 1777. Bartram has been described as "the first naturalist who penetrated the dense tropical forests of Florida".

Bartram was one of the first ornithologists born in America. In 1756, at the age of 17, he collected the type specimens of 14 species of American birds, which were illustrated and described by the English naturalist George Edwards in Gleanings of Natural History vol. 2 (1760). These accounts formed the basis of the scientific descriptions of Linnaeus (1707–1778), Johann Friedrich Gmelin (1748–1804) and John Latham (1740–1837). Bartram also made significant contributions to botanical literature. Like his father, he was a member of the American Philosophical Society, elected in 1768.

The standard author abbreviation W.Bartram is used to indicate this person as the author when citing a botanical name.

== Early life and family ==
The son of Ann (née Mendenhall) and the naturalist John Bartram, William and his twin sister Elizabeth were born in Kingsessing, Philadelphia, in the Province of Pennsylvania. As a boy, he accompanied his father on many of his travels to the Catskill Mountains, the New Jersey Pine Barrens, New England, and Florida. From his mid-teens, Bartram was noted for the quality of his botanic and ornithological drawings. He also had an increasing role in the maintenance of his father's botanic garden, and added many rare species to it.

On "may ye 30th 1756", his father John wrote the following passage in a letter to the English naturalist Peter Collinson: "Billy is much obliged to thee for his drawing paper...he hath drawn many rare birds in order to send to thee & dryed ye birds to send to his friend edwards to whome he is much obliged for those two curious bookes...he spent his time this spring in shooting & drawing ye rare birds of quick passage..."

In 1758, Peter Collinson praised the young Bartram as "an ingenious young man" and published descriptions and engravings of his drawings of Eastern Box Turtle (Testudo carolina) and Spotted Turtle (Clemmys guttata).

== Bartram's explorations (1773–77) ==
=== Travels in Georgia ===
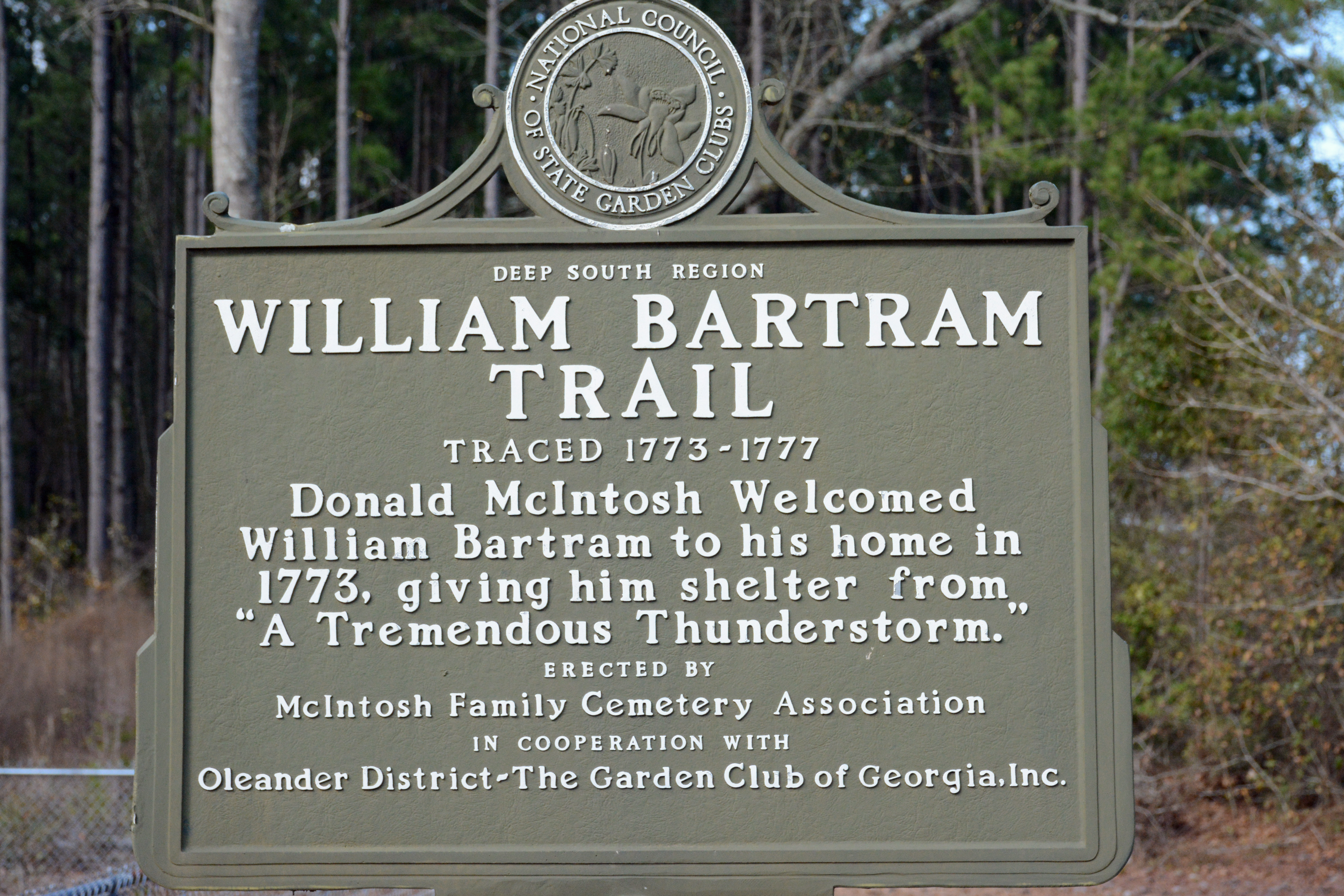
William Bartram Trail marker in McIntosh County, Georgia, USA

William Bartram arrived in Charleston on March 31, 1773. He learned that a Native American congress was to take place in Augusta, Georgia in June and was invited by Superintendent of Indian affairs, John Stuart, to join the party that would survey a new land cession. After attending to some business Bartram traveled on to Savannah, arriving in that city on either April 11 or 12. While he awaited the beginning of the Native American congress he traveled to the coast of Georgia. He first visited some rice plantations in Midway then traveled on to Darien where he was the guest of Lachlan McIntosh.

In Travels, Bartram related an incident at this point that most probably took place in 1776. As he traveled through the sparsely populated country of South Georgia, he encountered an "intrepid Siminole" who had resolved upon killing the next white man he met but was disarmed by Bartram's unexpected friendliness.

During his trip along the coast, Bartram revisited the region of Fort Barrington on the Altamaha River. John and William Bartram had discovered two new trees there in 1765, but they had no flowers for the season was late. William described these trees in Travels, the Franklin tree (Franklinia alatamaha) and fevertree (Pinkneya pubens). The Franklin tree no longer exists in the wild and all living trees are descended from seeds collected by William Bartram.

Bartram then traveled to Augusta and explored the area while he awaited the conclusion of the Native American congress. The conference ended on June 3, 1773, with the Treaty of Augusta. In return for dissolving their debts to the traders in Augusta, the Creeks and Cherokees gave up 674,000 acres of land in northeast Georgia. Bartram joined the survey party as it marked the boundary. An incident occurred at a place known as the Great Buffalo Lick when the Native Americans questioned the accuracy of the surveyor's course. When the surveyor said it was right because the compass told him so the chief, Young Warrior, said that:

... he knew better, and the little wicked instrument was a liar; and he would not acquiesce in its decisions, since it would wrong the Indians out of their land. This mistake (the surveyor proving to be in the wrong) displeased the Indians; the dispute arose to that height, that the Chief and his party had determined to break up the business, and return the shortest way home, and forbad the surveyors to proceed any farther: however, after some delay, the complaisance and prudent conduct of the Colonel made them change their resolution; the Chief became reconciled, upon condition that the compass should be discarded, and rendered incapable of serving on this business; that the Chief himself should lead the survey; and, moreover, receive an order for a very considerable quantity of goods.

Bartram returned to Savannah in mid-July and spent the fall and winter on the coast of Georgia, exploring the Altamaha River, writing his report, and preparing his seeds for shipment to England.

=== Travels in Florida ===
In March 1774, Bartram began his much-anticipated trip to East Florida. He crossed the mouth of the St. Marys River and landed on the north end of Amelia Island, then crossing Egan's creek he traveled to Lord Egmont's plantation, near where the town of Fernandina would later arise. There he was entertained by Stephen Egan, Egmont's agent, who rode with him around the entire island observing the plantation and Indian mounds. Bartram and Egan sailed from Amelia Island on the inner passage (now the Intracoastal Waterway) to the St. Johns River and to the Cow Ford, the future site of Jacksonville, where Bartram purchased a little sailboat. In three days Bartram landed at the plantation of Francis Philip Fatio at Switzerland. There he received information concerning the recent disturbances at Spalding's Stores. He paused the next day at Fort Picolata where he had failed as a planter seven years earlier. Bartram then kept to the west bank, or Indian shore, the river being the division between Indian country on the west bank and English land on the east. He observed a Seminole village on the bluff where Palatka now stands and where he was invited to a watermelon feast that summer. Just south of Palatka, at Stokes Landing, James Spalding built his Lower Store where Bartram made his headquarters while in Florida. One day while working at his desk Bartram heard a disturbance in the adjacent Indian camp. Stepping outside he discovered his Seminole neighbors were alarmed by a large rattlesnake that had entered their camp. They entreated "Puc Puggy" to come kill the snake, which Bartram reluctantly agreed to do. Later he saw three young men approaching. He wrote:

I observed one of them was a young prince who had, on my first interview with him, declared himself my friend and protector, when he told me that if ever occasion should offer in his presence, he would risk his life to defend mine or my property. This young champion stood by his two associates, one on each side of him, the two affecting a countenance and air of displeasure and importance, instantly presenting their scratching instruments, and flourishing them, spoke boldly, and said that I was too heroic and violent, that it would be good for me to loose some of my blood to make me more mild and tame, and for that purpose they were come to scratch me; they gave me no time to expostulate or reply, but attempted to lay hold on me, which I resisted, and my friend, the young prince, interposed and pushed them off, saying that I was a brave warrior and his friend, that they should not insult me, when instantly they altered their countenance and behaviour; they all whooped in chorus, took me friendly by the hand, clapped me on the shoulder and laid their hands on their breasts in token of sincere friendship, and laughing aloud, said I was a sincere friend to the Siminoles,...

Bartram joined Spalding's traders in mid-April on a trip to Cuscowilla (Micanopy) and Alachua Savannah, now Paynes Prairie Preserve State Park. In late May, Bartram traveled up the St. Johns River to Spalding's Upper Store at present-day Astor and to Blue Spring. Some of the most memorable events in Travels occurred during this trip upriver when a wolf stole his fish as Bartram slept, he was jostled and threatened by alligators while fishing from his boat, and he was witness to a territorial battle between two of the monsters. He wrote:

Behold him rushing forth from the flags and reeds. His enormous body swells. His plaited tail brandished high floats upon the lake. The waters like a cataract descend from his opening jaws. Clouds of smoke issue from his dilated nostrils. The earth trembles with his thunder. When immediately from the opposite coast of the lagoon, emerges from the deep his rival champion. They suddenly dart upon each other. The boiling surface of the lake marks their rapid course, and a terrific conflict commences. They now sink to the bottom folded together in horrid wreaths. The water becomes thick and discolored. Again they rise, their jaws clap together, re-echoing through the deep surrounding forests. Again they sink, when the contest ends at the muddy bottom of the lake, and the vanquished makes a hazardous escape, hiding himself in the muddy turbulent waters and sedge on a distant shore. The proud victor exulting returns to the place of action. The shores and forests resound his dreadful roar, together with the triumphing shouts of the plaited tribes around, witnesses of the horrid combat.

During the summer Bartram made another excursion to Alachua Savannah and on to the Suwannee River. He traveled one last time up the St. Johns River in September and left Florida forever in November 1774.

=== Exploration of the Cherokee Nation ===
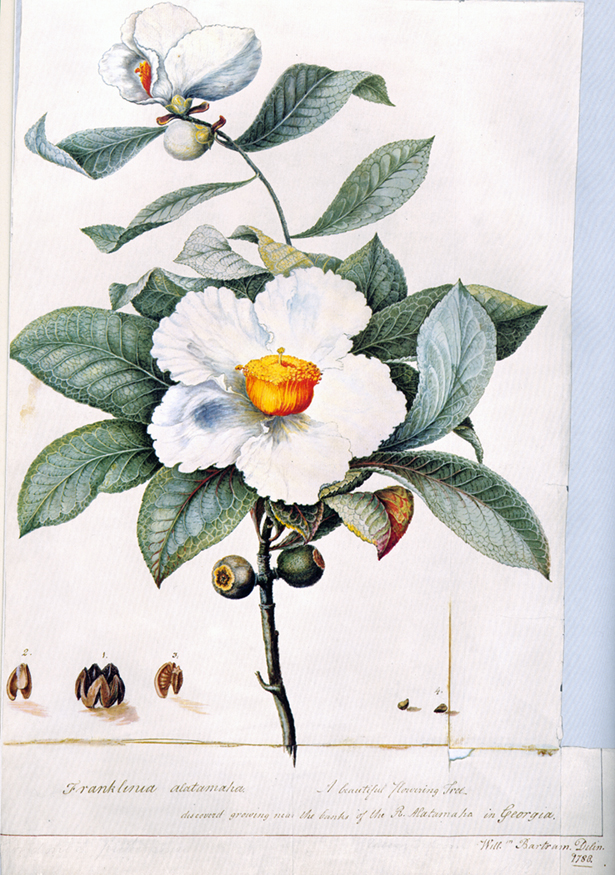
Franklinia alatamaha by William Bartram (1782)

On April 22, 1775, Bartram left Charleston, South Carolina on horseback to explore the Cherokee Nation. After passing through Augusta May 10, Dartmouth on May 15, a few days later he left Fort Prince George and Keowee after not being able to procure a guide.

In addition to his botanizing, Bartram aptly described the journey:

...all alone in a wild Indian country, a thousand miles from my native land, and a vast distance from any settlements of white people.

It was now after noon; I approached a charming vale, amidst sublimely high forests, awful shades! Darkness gathers around, far distant thunder rolls over the trembling hills; the black clouds with august majesty and power, moves slowly forwards, shading regions of towering hills, and threatening all the destructions of a thunderstorm; all around is now still as death, not a whisper is heard, but a total inactivity and silence seems to pervade the earth; the birds afraid to utter a chirrup, and in low tremulous voices take leave of each other, seeking covert and safety; every insect is silenced, and nothing heard but the roaring of the approaching hurricane; the mighty cloud now expands its sable wings, extending from North to South, and is driven irresistibly on by the tumultuous winds, spreading his livid wings around the gloomy concave, armed with terrors of thunder and fiery shafts of lightning; now the lofty forests bend low beneath its fury, their limbs and wavy boughs are tossed about and catch hold of each other; the mountains tremble and seem to reel about, and the ancient hills to be shaken to their foundations: the furious storm sweeps along, smoaking through the vale and over the resounding hills; the face of the earth is obscured by the deluge descending from the firmament, and I am deafened by the din of thunder; the tempestuous scene damps my spirits, and my horse sinks under me at the tremendous peals, as I hasten for the plain.

== Return to Philadelphia ==
Bartram returned to Philadelphia in January 1777 and assisted his brother John in all aspects of running Bartram's Garden.

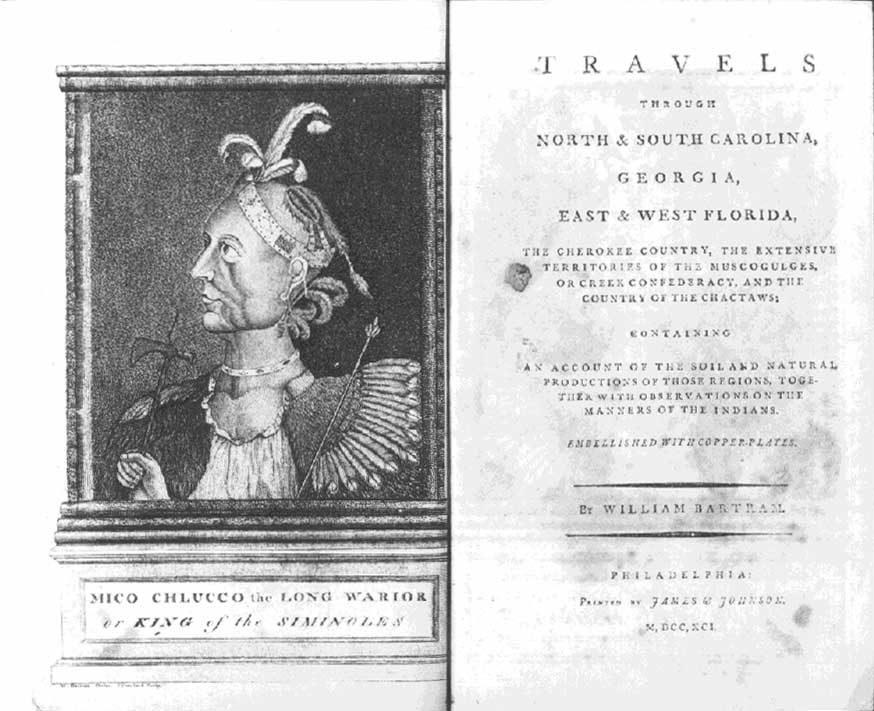
Frontispiece and title page of Travels

In the late 1780s, he completed the book for which he became most famous, Travels through North and South Carolina, Georgia, East and West Florida, the Cherokee Country, etc. It was considered at the time one of the foremost books on American natural history. Many of Bartram's accounts of historical sites were the earliest records, including the Georgia mound site of Ocmulgee. In addition to its contributions to scientific knowledge, Travels is noted for its original descriptions of the American countryside. Bartram's writing influenced many of the Romantic writers of the day. William Wordsworth, Samuel Taylor Coleridge, and François-René de Chateaubriand are known to have read the book, and its influence can be seen in many of their works.

Although Bartram has often been characterized as a recluse, all evidence shows that he remained active in commercial, scientific, and intellectual pursuits well into the nineteenth century. He tutored nieces and nephews, penned a number of essays, contributed to several works anonymously, and helped run the family horticultural business. In 1802, Bartram met the school teacher Alexander Wilson and began to teach him the rudiments of ornithology and natural history illustration. Wilson's American Ornithology includes many references to Bartram and the area around Bartram's Garden. Among Bartram's more significant later contributions were the illustrations for his friend Benjamin Smith Barton's explanation of the Linnaean system, Elements of Botany (1803–04).

After the War of 1812, when many of his colleagues, contacts, and friends had died, Bartram settled into a long period of work, observation, and study at the family's garden in Kingsessing. He maintained a "Diary" that records bird migrations, plant life, and the weather. He refused a request to teach botany at the University of Pennsylvania, and in his sixties, declined an invitation from President Thomas Jefferson to accompany an expedition up the Red River in the Louisiana Territory, in 1806.

== Death ==
Bartram died at his home in 1823, at the age of 84. According to a short biography penned by Robert Carr, "He wrote an article on the natural history of a plant a few minutes before his death." Details of the event were described in a letter by Thomas L. McKenney to Dolley Madison, dated July 28, 1835:

"My Dear Madam, / You once did me the favor to send me some lines on the traveller & Botanist Bartram. I send with this a likeness of that excellent man ... On a visit receently [sic] to Bartram's garden Mr. Car pointed out the spot where the old man died. You will doubtless remember it. It is under a pear tree that grewe at the south corner of the house. You have doubtless seen it. The old man, then in his 86th year, rose from the Table, taking with him a bit of bread & cheese, saying – "I will do as the boys do." In going out, he reached the pear tree – where he was shortly after discovered throwing up blood from his lungs. A crumb, it supposed, choaking him, he ruptured, in his efforts to dislodge it, a blood vessel. He walked [to] another pear tree near the west corner of the house, & returning, aided by the family, he reached the first, under which he was discovered, were he died."

== Namesakes ==
Numerous places and sites are named in his honor:

- The Bartram Trail, a hiking trail in North Carolina, Georgia, and South Carolina that commemorates his journeys through the area.
- The Bartram Canoe Trail system of canoe and kayak trails in the Mobile-Tensaw River Delta.
- William Bartram Scenic & Historic Highway, part of Florida State Road 13 that runs along the east side of the St. Johns River from Jacksonville, Florida south into northwestern St. Johns County.
- Bartram Trail High School (St. Johns County School District) in St. Johns, Florida.
- Bartram Trail Elementary School and Bartram Springs Elementary School (Duval County Public Schools) in Jacksonville, Florida.
- The William Bartram Arboretum, located within Fort Toulouse Park, near Wetumpka, Alabama.
- Bartram Hall on the University of Florida campus in Gainesville, Florida.
- Bartram Trail Regional Library System in east Georgia
- Bartram's bass, or redeye bass (Micropterus coosae), a fish species found only in the Savannah River drainage in Georgia.
- The Upland Sandpiper (Bartramia longicauda) takes its genus name from William Bartram.

Bartram died on July 22, 1823, at Bartram's Garden.

== In popular culture ==
- In Lauren Groff's short story, "Flower Hunters", from her collection, Florida, the unnamed female protagonist has immersed herself in the chronicles of William Bartram: "Like Bartram, she was once a Northerner, dazzled by the frenzied flora and fauna here." The narrator concludes, "She's most definitely in love with that dead Quaker." The story is set in present-day Florida with flashbacks to Bartram and his travels and observations, which form a backdrop to the plot.

== Bibliography ==
- Travels through North and South Carolina, Georgia, East and West Florida, the Cherokee Country, etc. Philadelphia, James & Johnson, 1791. Modern editions include:
  - The Travels of William Bartram: Naturalist's Edition. ed. Frances Harper. Yale University Press: New Haven, CT, 1958. ISBN 978-0-8203-2027-4
  - William Bartram: Travels and Other Writings. Thomas Slaughter, editor. Library of America, 1996. ISBN 978-1-883011-11-6.
  - Travels and Other Writings: Travels through North and South Carolina, Georgia, East and West Florida ... Ronald E. Latham, editor. Penguin, 1988. ISBN 0-14-017008-1
  - Travels Through North and South Carolina, Georgia, East and West Florida. University of Virginia Press, 1980. ISBN 0-8139-0871-X
  - William Bartram, 1739–1823: Travels etc. Documenting the American South, University Library, University of North Carolina.

== Literature ==
- Bartram Trail Conference, Bartram Heritage: A Study of the Life of William Bartram. Montgomery, Alabama, 1979
- Bell, Whitfield J., Jr., Patriot-Improvers: Biographical Sketches of Members of the American Philosophical Society, vol. 1, 1743–1768. American Philosophical Society, Philadelphia, 1997, "WIlliam Bartram (1739–1823), pp. 414–424.
- Borland, Hal. The Memorable Bartrams. American Heritage Magazine. April 1975. Volume 26, Issue 3. Accessed March 2, 2007.
- Cashin, Edward J. William Bartram in Georgia. New Georgia Encyclopedia. Accessed March 2, 2007.
- Dallmeyer, Dorinda. 2020. Bartram's Living Legacy: The Travels and the Nature of the South. Macon, GA: Mercer University Press.
- Ewan, Joseph, ed., William Bartram Botanical and Zoological Drawings, 1756–1788. American Philosophical Society, Philadelphia, 1968.
- Fagin, N. Bryllion, William Bartram: Interpreter of the American Landscape. The Johns Hopkins Press, Baltimore, 1933.
- Fishman, Gail. (2001) Journeys Through Paradise, University Press of Florida. ISBN 0-8130-1874-9
- Hallock, Thomas. From the Fallen Tree: Frontier Narratives, Environmental Politics, and the Roots of a National Pastoral. University of North Carolina Press, 2003.
- Hallock, Thomas and Nancy E. Hoffmann, eds. William Bartram, The Search for Nature's Design: Selected Art, Letters, and Unpublished Writings. University of Georgia Press, Athens, GA, 2010.
- Harper, Francis, "Travels in Georgia and Florida, 1773–74. A Report to Dr. John Fothergill." Edited by Francis Harper. Trans. of the American Philosophical Society, n. s. vol. 33, part 2 (November 1943), p. 121–242.
- Braund, Kathryn E. Holland and Charlotte M. Porter, eds. Fields of Vision: Essays on the "Travels" of William Bartram (University of Alabama Press; 2010; 273 pages), essays by scholars
- Lowes, John Livingston, The Road to Xanadu: A Study in the Ways of Imagination. Houghton Mifflin, New York, 1927.
- Magee, Judith, The Art and Science of William Bartram. The Pennsylvania State University Press, University Park, in association with the Natural History Museum, London, 2007.
- Martin, Brent. 2026. William Bartram and the Nature that Could have Been. Mercer University Press.
- Savage, Henry Jr. Discovering America, 1700–1875. pp. 63–70. Harper & Row, 1979.
- "William Bartram" Dictionary of Literary Biography, Volume 37: American Writers of the Early Republic. Emory Elliot, ed. The Gale Group, 1985, pp. 31–38.
- "William Bartram 1739–1823" Dictionary of American Biography. American Council of Learned Societies, 1928–1936.
- Schafer, Daniel L., William Bartram and the Ghost Plantations of British East Florida, University Press of Florida, 2010.
