= William Bartram (North Carolina politician) =

American scientist (1711–1770)

Member of the North Carolina House of Burgesses from Bladen County
- In office 1739–1740
- In office 1746–1768

Personal details
- Born: June 14, 1711 Darby, Province of Pennsylvania
- Died: October 24, 1770 (aged 59) Bladen County, Province of North Carolina
- Spouse: Elizabeth (née Lock) Smith
- Children: William; Mary; Sarah
- Parents: William Bartram (father); Elizabeth Smith (mother)
- Relatives: John Bartram (half-brother); William Bartram (nephew)
- Occupation: Planter; scientist; militiaman; politician

Military service
- Branch/service: North Carolina militia
- Rank: Colonel

Colonel William Bartram (June 14, 1711 – October 24, 1770) was an American scientist and politician in the Province of North Carolina. He was a Quaker and the uncle of the naturalist of the same name.

Born in Darby in the Province of Pennsylvania three months before his father William Bartram was killed during the Tuscarora War in the Province of Carolina in 1711, he was captured by the Tuscarora with his family, and later returned to Pennsylvania after they were ransomed by relatives from Philadelphia. The younger William Bartram later returned to see to his father's estate, after Native Americans were removed from the area, and became a prominent planter, colonel of the militia, and long-time member of the colonial legislature.

== Biography ==
William Bartram was born on June 14, 1711, in Darby in the Province of Pennsylvania to William Bartram and his second wife Elizabeth (née Smith). After his father was killed during the Tuscarora War, he was taken captive by the Tuscarora with his family and was later ransomed by relatives from Philadelphia. He lived in Pennsylvania for many years.

By 1732 and after Native Americans were removed from the area, he returned to North Carolina to see to his father's estate and settled on the Cape Fear River in the Bladen district shortly before it was made a county. One account says he returned to North Carolina in 1726. He received several grants for land from the Crown. He purchased land that was owned by John Baptista Ashe, the father of governor Samuel Ashe, who had patented a tract of six hundred and forty acres on the Northwest branch of the Cape Fear River and designated it as Ashwood on November 27, 1730. On this land Bartram had a plantation known as Ashwood. Ashwood was located on the south bluff on the Cape Fear River near Westbrook, in Bladen County. Bartram represented Bladen County in the North Carolina House of Burgesses from 1739 to 1740, and from 1746 to 1768. In 1739 he introduced a bill to establish Wilmington, named after one of his patrons, Spencer Compton, Earl of Wilmington.

In addition to being a colonel of the militia and a scientist, he was also a justice of the peace of Bladen County and was on the local freeholders court which heard cases involving enslaved individuals.

He married Elizabeth (née Lock) Smith, a daughter of Thomas Lock, whose will was proved by Gabriel Johnston at his Brompton plantation in 1739, and Sarah Thomas. His wife had been a widow of a man with the surname Smith. Bartram had a stepdaughter, Susanna Smith, whose husband named Anthony Gully is mentioned in a letter written by William in 1760 to his half-brother John. Bartram had three children with Elizabeth (née Lock) Smith, namely William, Mary, and Sarah.

=== Visits by John and William Bartram ===
John Bartram visited his half-brother William many times during the 1760s. John's son William Bartram, the naturalist, or Billy as his father John and mother Ann had called him lived with the Bartrams at Ashwood for four years, from 1761 to 1765. Young Billy had arrived in Bladen County attempting to become a merchant after he completed his apprenticeship with a merchant in Philadelphia. His mercantile operation was never successful. Billy made one more attempt to profit in Cape Fear in 1771, but quickly ran out of money and was bailed out by his father. Billy left Ashwood in the latter part of 1772, by the time his uncle, his uncle's wife Elizabeth, and cousin William had all died. It has been suggested that William Bartram, the naturalist, had a love-affair with his cousin Mary, the daughter of Colonel William Bartram. While nothing definite can be surmised by the remainder of their letters, the younger William held a fondness for Ashwood and corresponded with Mary often throughout his later years. He once wrote Mary, widowed after her marriage with Thomas Robeson Jr., a patriot leader of the Battle of Elizabethtown and the namesake of Robeson County, of the beautiful landscapes around Cape Fear, calling it "the temperate and flowery region". He also spoke of it as "your delightful country", adding that she is "the most pleasing object."

=== Burial ===
Colonel William Bartram died on October 24, 1770. Colonel William Bartram, his wife Elizabeth, his daughter Sarah, his granddaughter Elizabeth Brown, and his son William Bartram III are buried at the same brick enclosure at the Carver's Creek burying ground at the Carver's Creek Quaker Meeting House, which later became the Carver's Creek Methodist Church, in Bladen County, North Carolina.

== Legacy ==
His plantation Ashwood acquired a reputation for being haunted and was consequently pulled down in 1856 or 1857 after both a slave known as Dorcas, born in 1810 or 1812, and Eliza, the daughter of David B. Gillespie and wife of John A. Robeson, purported to have seen two ghosts at the plantation. The ghosts were of the fiancée of William's son William, who after he had died of yellow fever in Brunswick, despondently drowned herself in the Cape Fear River at a place still known today as Polly White's Leap, and Thomas Brown, who was a patriot leader of the Battle of Elizabethtown, the husband of William's daughter Sarah, and a widower who had lived in Ashwood and was forced to transfer it to William's daughter Mary by an act passed by the North Carolina General Assembly of 1777.

White Lake was formerly known as Bartram Lake. Bartram once owned the land near the lake.

His nephew, the naturalist, left a tribute to Bartram at Ashwood "beloved and esteemed for his patriotic Virtue in defending and supporting the Rights of Man, and particularly, the Poor, abandoned, and the Stranger. His House was open, and his Table free, to his neighbors, the oppressed, and the Stranger." sic
