= Kingsessing, Philadelphia =

Kingsessing
- Neighborhood of Philadelphia
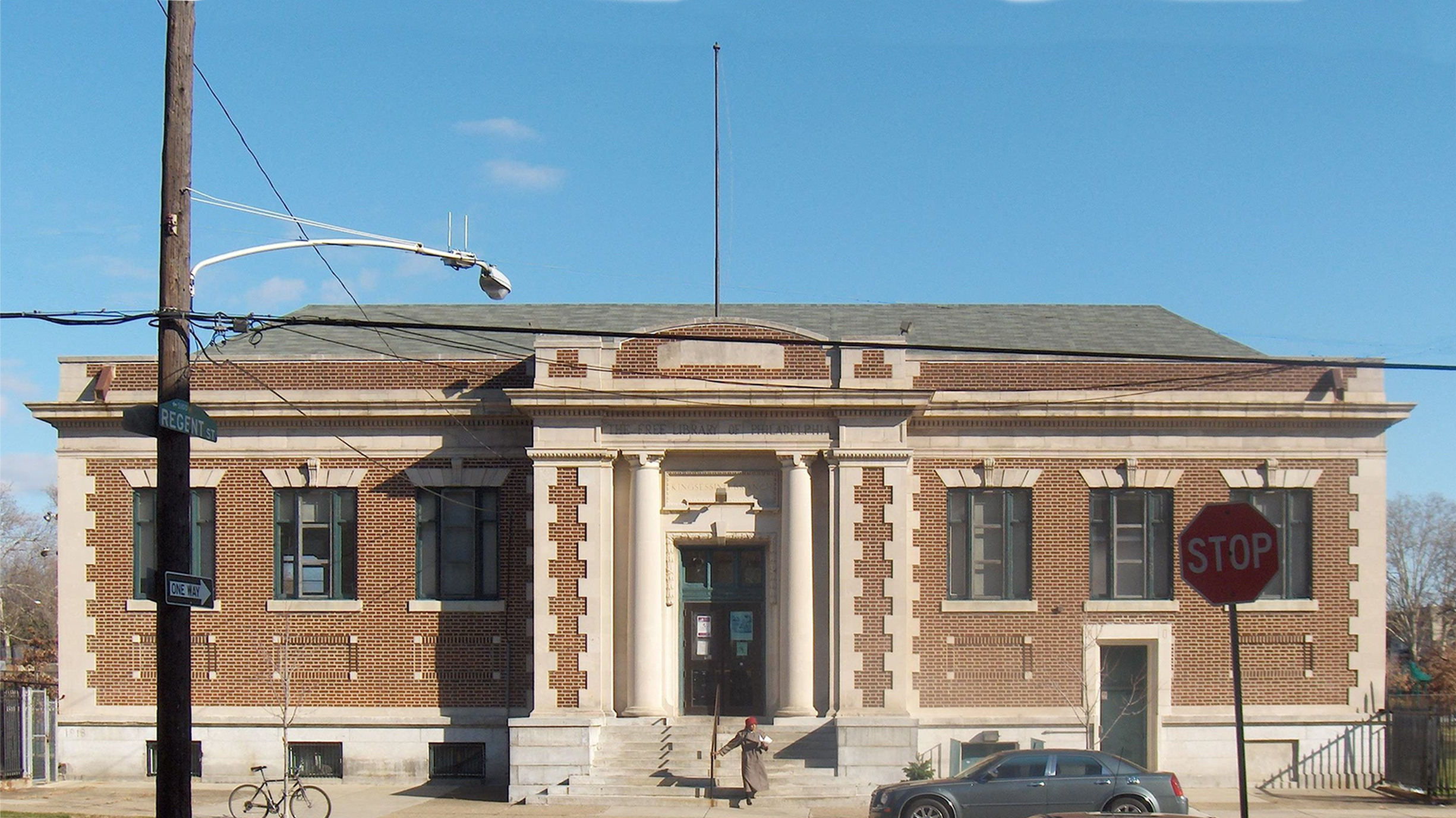
- The Kingsessing Branch of the Free Library of Philadelphia

- Location within Philadelphia
- Country: United States
- State: Pennsylvania
- County: Philadelphia
- City: Philadelphia
- Area codes: 215, 267, and 445

Kingsessing is a neighborhood in the Southwest section of Philadelphia, Pennsylvania, United States. On the west side of the Schuylkill River, it is next to the neighborhoods of Cedar Park and Elmwood Park, as well as the borough of Yeadon in Delaware County. It is roughly bounded by the SEPTA Regional Rail Media/Wawa Line to the northeast, Baltimore Avenue to the northwest, Cobbs Creek and 60th Street to the southwest, and Woodland Avenue to the southeast.

== History ==
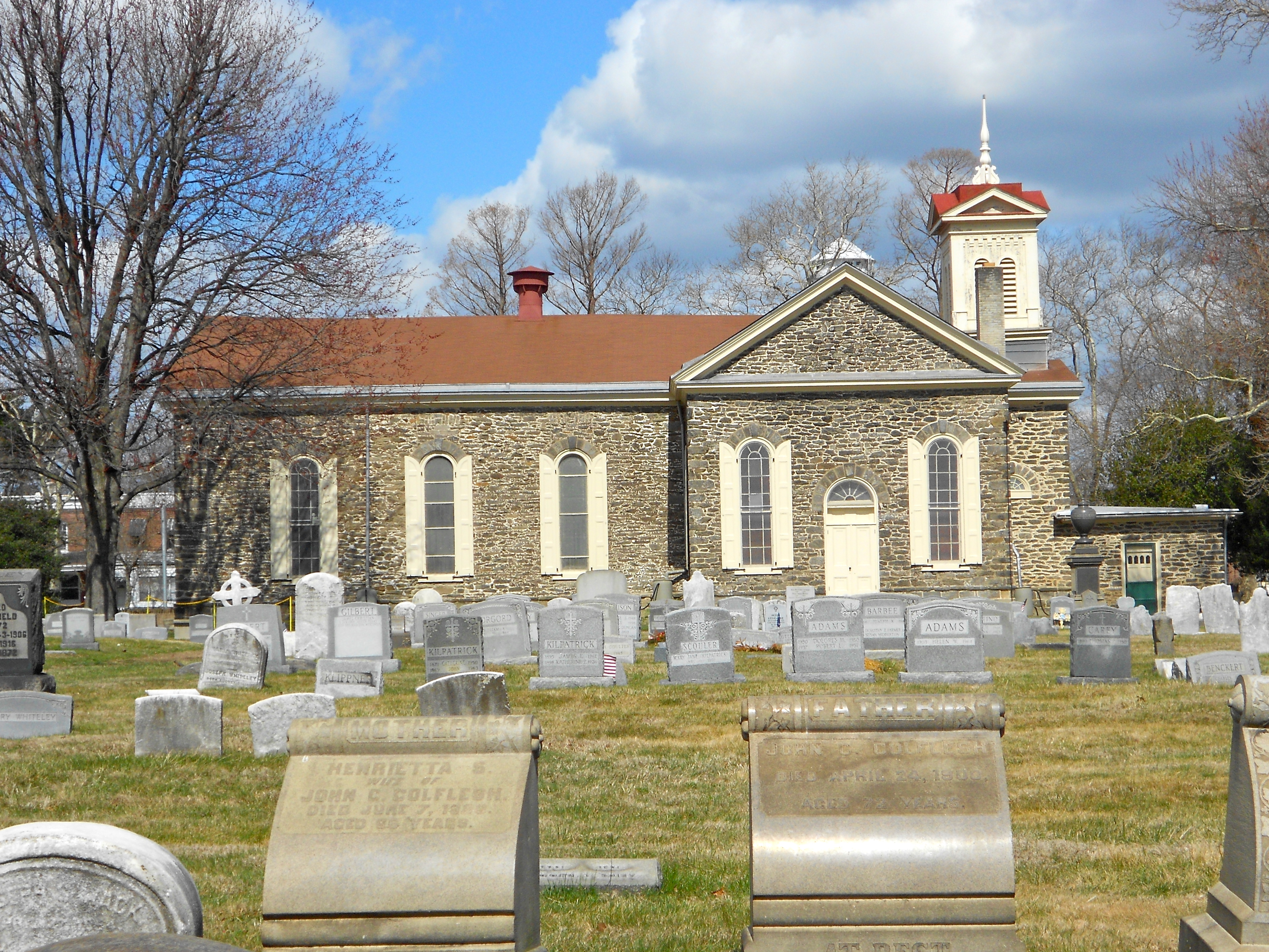
St. James Kingsessing Episcopal Church

The name Kingsessing, also spelled Chinsessing, comes from a Lenape word meaning "a place where there is a meadow". The Lenape, or Delaware as the English called them, had a village of the same name that roughly occupied the same site as where the current neighborhood was later developed. When the township was organized to encompass where the Lenape and a later Swedish village stood, it also was named as Kingsessing.

In 1669 Hans Månsson, a Swedish settler, received a patent for an 1,100-acre plantation along the Schuylkill River between the current location of 60th Street and Woodlands Cemetery, extending as far west as Cobb's Creek.

Bartram's Garden, started by colonial botanist John Bartram in 1728, is still operated in this neighborhood. It had an international reputation and is considered the first true botanical garden in the United States. It has been designated as a National Historic Landmark. John Bartram's grandson William Bartram (1739–1823) was born and died in Kingsessing.

Mount Moriah Cemetery was founded next to Cobbs Creek in 1855. The neighborhood near the cemetery is also known as Mount Moriah, part of which is in Elmwood Park.

The S. Weir Mitchell School, Regent-Rennoc Court and Anna Howard Shaw Junior High School are on the National Register of Historic Places.

== Demographics ==
As of 2011, Kingsessing is 83.2% black.

== Infrastructure and government ==
- The United States Postal Service operates the Kingsessing Post Office at 5311 Florence Avenue.
- Grays Ferry Bridge
- 49th Street station (SEPTA Regional Rail)
- Schuylkill River Trail

== Education ==
=== Public libraries ===
Free Library of Philadelphia operates the Kingsessing Branch at 1201 South 51st Street, below Chester Avenue.

== See also ==
- 2023 Kingsessing, Philadelphia shooting
- New Sweden
- Newkirk Viaduct Monument
