= John Bartram =

American botanist (1699–1777)

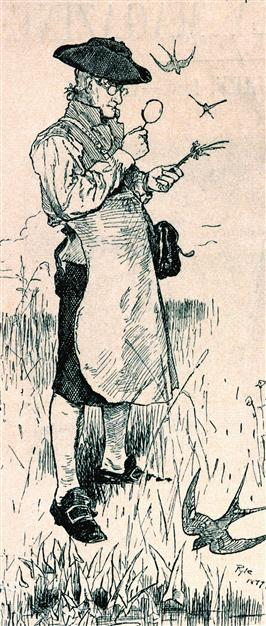
- Drawing by Howard Pyle
- Born: March 23, 1699; Marple, Province of Pennsylvania, British America
- Died: September 22, 1777 (aged 78); Philadelphia, Pennsylvania, U.S.
- Resting place: Darby Friends Cemetery, Darby, Pennsylvania, U.S.
- Spouses: Mary Maris (m. 1723; died 1727) Ann Mendenhall (m. 1729)
- Parents: William Bartram (father); Elizabeth Hunt (mother)
- Relatives: John Bartram; (grandfather); William Bartram; (half-brother)
- Scientific career
- Fields: Botany
- Author abbrev. (botany): Bartram

John Bartram (June 3, 1699 – September 22, 1777) was an American botanist, horticulturist, and explorer, based in Philadelphia, Pennsylvania, for most of his career. Swedish botanist and taxonomist Carl Linnaeus spoke of him as the "greatest natural botanist in the world." Bartram corresponded with and shared North American plants and seeds with a variety of scientists in England and Europe.

He started what is known as Bartram's Garden in 1728 at his farm in Kingsessing (now part of Philadelphia). It was considered the first botanic garden in the United States. His sons and descendants operated it until 1850. Still operating in a partnership between the city of Philadelphia and a non-profit foundation, it was designated a National Historic Landmark in 1960.

== Early life ==
Bartram was born into a prominent Quaker political and farming family in Darby, Pennsylvania, on June 3, 1699. His parents were William Bartram and his first wife Elizabeth (née Hunt). His mother Elizabeth died in 1701. John Bartram and his brother James were left to be raised with their maternal grandfather James Hunt of Kingsessing. William Bartram, his father, was killed and his stepmother and half-siblings were captured during the Tuscarora War in 1711. Elizabeth (née Smith), John's stepmother, brought his half-siblings to Pennsylvania after the family was ransomed by relatives from Philadelphia. John remained in Pennsylvania, while one of his brothers, also named William, later went to North Carolina to take care of the estate of their father.

Bartram later wrote "all my younger years being subject to grip, grievous coughs, heartburn, acrimonious looseness, dizziness, and rheumatism." He was afflicted with a "slavish fear of lightning" that carried with him to adulthood. Bartram considered himself to be a plain farmer, with no formal education beyond the local school. He had a lifelong interest in medicine and medicinal plants, and read widely. He started his botanical career by devoting a small area of his farm to growing plants he found interesting. Later, he made contact with European botanists and gardeners interested in North American plants, and developed his hobby into a thriving business.

== Plant collecting, correspondence, and travels ==
Bartram began to travel extensively in the eastern American colonies in order to study and collect plants.

Bartram maintained a friendship with Peter Collinson, Alexander Catcot, and others through letter writing between London and the colonies, and he regularly collected specimens for Collinson and others in Europe who were interested in obtaining unfamiliar species from the New World for their gardens and scientific study.

In 1737 Bartram travelled by horseback through modern day Delaware and the Eastern Shore of Maryland to Northampton County, Virginia. In the fall of 1738, he made another excursion from his home in Philadelphia through Virginia, visiting the Gover family in Anne Arundel County, to Port Tobacco on the Potomac. Cedar Point, Maryland, opposite Hooe's Ferry in King George County, Virginia, and then went to Fredericksburg. He proceeded to visit John Clayton in Gloucester County, Virginia, crossed the York River to visit John Custis in Williamsburg, Virginia, and then journeyed up the James River to visit William Byrd II's plantation at Westover. He continued westward to visit Isham Randolph's Dungeness estate, and then continued west to the Blue Ridge Mountains and the Shenandoah Valley.

In 1743, he visited western parts of New York and the northern shores of Lake Ontario, and wrote Observations on the Inhabitants, Climate, Soil, Rivers, Productions, Animals, and other Matters Worthy of Notice, made by Mr. John Bartram in his Travels from Pennsylvania to Onondaga, Oswego, and the Lake Ontario, in Canada (London, 1751). During the winter of 1765/66, he visited East Florida in the south, which was a British colony, and published an account of this trip with his journal (London, 1766). He also visited areas along the Ohio River west of the Appalachian Mountains. Many of his plant acquisitions were shipped to collectors in Europe. In return, they supplied him with books and apparatus.

Bartram, sometimes called the "father of American botany", was one of the first practicing Linnaean botanists in North America. He forwarded plant specimens to Carl Linnaeus, Dillenius, and Gronovius. He also assisted Pehr Kalm, the student of Linnaeus, during his extended collecting trip to North America in 1748–1750.

Bartram was aided in his collecting efforts by other British colonists. In Bartram's Diary of a Journey through the Carolinas, Georgia and Florida, a trip taken from July 1, 1765, to April 10, 1766, Bartram wrote of specimens he had collected. During his time in East Florida, he was assisted by David Yeats, the secretary of the colony of East Florida.

About 1728, he established an 8-acre (32,000 m^{2}) botanic garden in Kingsessing, on the west bank of the Schuylkill, about 3 miles (5 km) from the center of Philadelphia, Pennsylvania. Known as Bartram's Garden, it is frequently cited as the first true botanic collection in North America. It was designated in 1960 as a National Historic Landmark.

In 1743, Bartram was one of the co-founders, along with Benjamin Franklin, of the American Philosophical Society in Philadelphia. It supported scientific studies as well as philosophy.

== Contact with other botanists ==
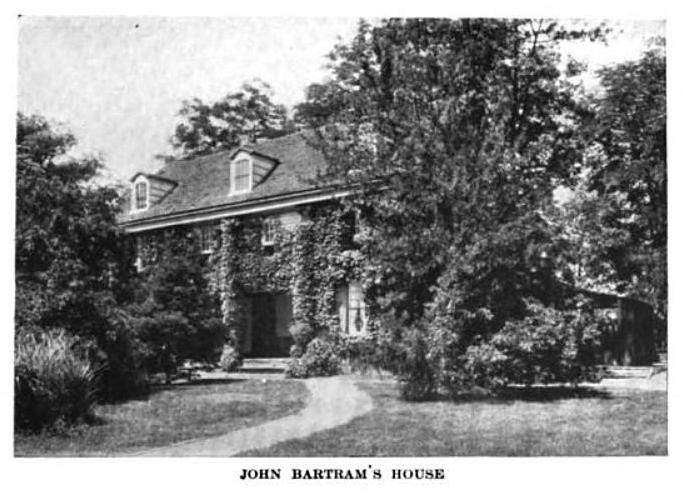
House of John Bartram located in Philadelphia, Pennsylvania, circa 1919

Bartram was particularly instrumental in sending seeds from the New World to European gardeners; many North American trees and flowers were first introduced into cultivation in Europe by this route. Beginning around 1733, Bartram's work was assisted by his association with the English merchant Peter Collinson. Collinson, also a lover of plants, was a fellow Quaker and a member of the Royal Society, with a familiar relationship with its president, Sir Hans Sloane. Collinson shared Bartram's new plants with friends and fellow gardeners. Early Bartram collections went to Lord Petre, Philip Miller at the Chelsea Physic Garden, Mark Catesby, the Duke of Richmond, and the Duke of Norfolk. In the 1730s, Robert James Petre, 8th Baron Petre of Thorndon Hall, Essex, was the foremost collector in Europe of North American trees and shrubs. Earl Petre's death in 1743 resulted in his American tree collection being auctioned off to Woburn, Goodwood, and other large English country estates. Thereafter, Collinson became Bartram's chief London agent.

"Bartram's Boxes", as they became known, were shipped regularly to Peter Collinson every fall for distribution in England to a wide list of clients, including the Duke of Argyll, James Gordon, James Lee, and John Busch, progenitor of the exotic Loddiges nursery in London. The boxes generally contained 100 or more varieties of seeds, and sometimes included dried plant specimens and natural history curiosities, as well. Live plants were more difficult and expensive to send and were reserved for Collinson and a few special correspondents.

In 1765, after lobbying by Collinson and Benjamin Franklin in London, George III rewarded Bartram a pension of £50 per year as King's Botanist for North America, a post he held until his death. With this position, Bartram shipped his seeds and plants also to the royal collection at Kew Gardens. Bartram also contributed seeds to the Oxford and Edinburgh botanic gardens. In 1769 he was elected a foreign member of the Royal Swedish Academy of Sciences in Stockholm.

Bartram died on September 22, 1777. He was buried at the Darby Friends Cemetery in Darby, Pennsylvania.

== Personal views ==
=== Native Americans ===
Bartram did not hold Native Americans in high regard, with his views affected by his father being killed while Bartram was young during the Tuscarora War. One letter Bartram wrote to Peter Collinson ends with "Many years past, in our most peaceable times, far beyond the mountains, as I was walking in a path with an Indian guide, hired for two dollars, an Indian man met me and pulled off my hat in a great passion, and chawed it all round—I suppose to show me that he would eat me if I came into that country again." Bartram twice wrote the only way to deal with the Native Americans "is to bang them stoutly".

=== Slavery ===
Bartram owned, bought, and sold a number of slaves throughout his life, and, to his later regret, helped his son William purchase slaves when he made a failing attempt at being a Florida planter. A letter John Bartram wrote mentioning his slave purchases to his son William reads, "all thy friends here laments thy resolute choice to live at St Johns & leave off drawing or writeing... thay say the negros will run away or murther thee". John Bartram wrote he received the "daily assistance & choice" of his friends in Charleston, which included Alexander Garden, Henry Laurens, and John Moultrie. It is clear from two letters to his son dated April 5 and 9, 1766, that Laurens was a major source of advice as he worked on obtaining plantation supplies and arranged the shipping of the slaves and supplies from Charleston to Florida. Bartram wrote a letter criticizing George Whitefield's ambition to educate slaves. There is also the remains of a grave at Bartram's Garden that is attributed to a free black individual that in as late as the 1860's was first given the name "Harvey". Although there is no historical record of Harvey, biographical accounts mention that Bartram freed a slave and told J. Hector St. John de Crèvecœur that one of his former slaves transacted his "business in Philadelphia, with a punctuality, from which he has never deviated."

=== Religion ===
In the letter criticizing George Whitefield, Bartram also expressed "utter disdain" for Whitefield's Calvinism. He was twice married, in accordance with the discipline of the Society of Friends, of which he was a member until 1758. Bartram was disowned for holding opinions not in accordance with the doctrines of Friends.

== Family ==
Coat of Arms of John Bartram

Bartram married twice, first in 1723 to Mary Maris (d. 1727), with whom he had two sons, Richard and Isaac. After her death, in 1729 he married Ann Mendenhall (1703–1789). They had five boys and four girls together.

His third son, William Bartram (1739–1823), became a noted botanist, naturalist, and ornithologist in his own right. He wrote Travels Through North & South Carolina, Georgia, East & West Florida,... which was published in Philadelphia by James & Johnson in 1791.

The family business in North American plants was continued after the American Revolutionary War by Bartram's sons John Bartram Jr. and William Bartram. A total of three generations of the Bartram family continued to operate and expand the botanic garden. Bartram's Garden was known as the major botanic garden in Philadelphia until the last Bartram heirs sold out in 1850.

== Legacy and honors ==
Most of Bartram's many plant discoveries were named by botanists in Europe. He is best known today for the discovery and introduction of a wide range of North American flowering trees and shrubs, including kalmia, rhododendron, and magnolia species; for introducing the Dionaea muscipula or Venus flytrap to cultivation; and for discovering the Franklin tree, Franklinia alatamaha in southeastern Georgia in 1765, later named by his son William Bartram.

A genus of mosses, Bartramia, was named for him, as were such plants as the North American serviceberry, Amelanchier bartramiana, as well as the subtropical tree Commersonia bartramia (brown kurrajong). This grows in an area from the Bellinger River in coastal eastern Australia to Cape York, Vanuatu, and Malaysia.

John Bartram High School in Philadelphia is named after him.

Bartram's Garden has been designated as a National Historic Landmark.

== See also ==
- List of gardener-botanist explorers of the Enlightenment
- Darby Meeting
- Darby Free Library
- Franklinia
- Humphry Marshall
- Thomas Say

== Bibliography ==
- Dillingham, William H. (1851). A Tribute to the Memory of Peter Collinson. With Some Notice of Dr. Darlington's Memorials of John Bartram and Humphry Marshall (1st ed.). Philadelphia: William H. Mitchell, 265 Chestnut Street.
- Wiley, Samuel T. (1893). Garner, Winfield Scott (ed.). Biographical and Portrait Cyclopedia of Chester County, Pennsylvania, Comprising a Historical Sketch of the County, Together With More Than Five Hundred Biographical Sketches of Prominent Men and Leading Citizens of the County. Richmond, Indiana: Gresham Publishing Company.
- Lee, Francis Bazley (1910). Genealogical and Memorial History of the State of New Jersey. Vol. III. New York: Lewis Historical Publishing Company.
- Jordan, John Woolf (1914). A History of Delaware County Pennsylvania and Its People. Vol. II. New York: Lewis Historical Publishing Company.
- Fagin, N. Bryllion (1933). William Bartram: Interpreter of the American Landscape. Baltimore: The Johns Hopkins Press.
- Earnest, Ernest (1940). John and William Bartram: Botanists and Explorers. Philadelphia: University of Pennsylvania Press.
- Berkeley, Edmund; Berkeley, Dorothy Smith, eds. (1992). The Correspondence of John Bartram, 1734–1777. Gainesville, Florida: University Press of Florida. ISBN 978-0813011233. LCCN 91-36371.
- Slaughter, Thomas Paul (1996). The Natures of John and William Bartram. New York: Alfred A. Knopf. ISBN 0-679-43045-8. LCCN 96-25551.
- Goodall, Jane (2013). Seeds of Hope: Wisdom and Wonder from the World of Plants. Grand Central Publishing. ISBN 978-1-4555-1321-5.
