= Independence Hall =

Building in Philadelphia, Pennsylvania

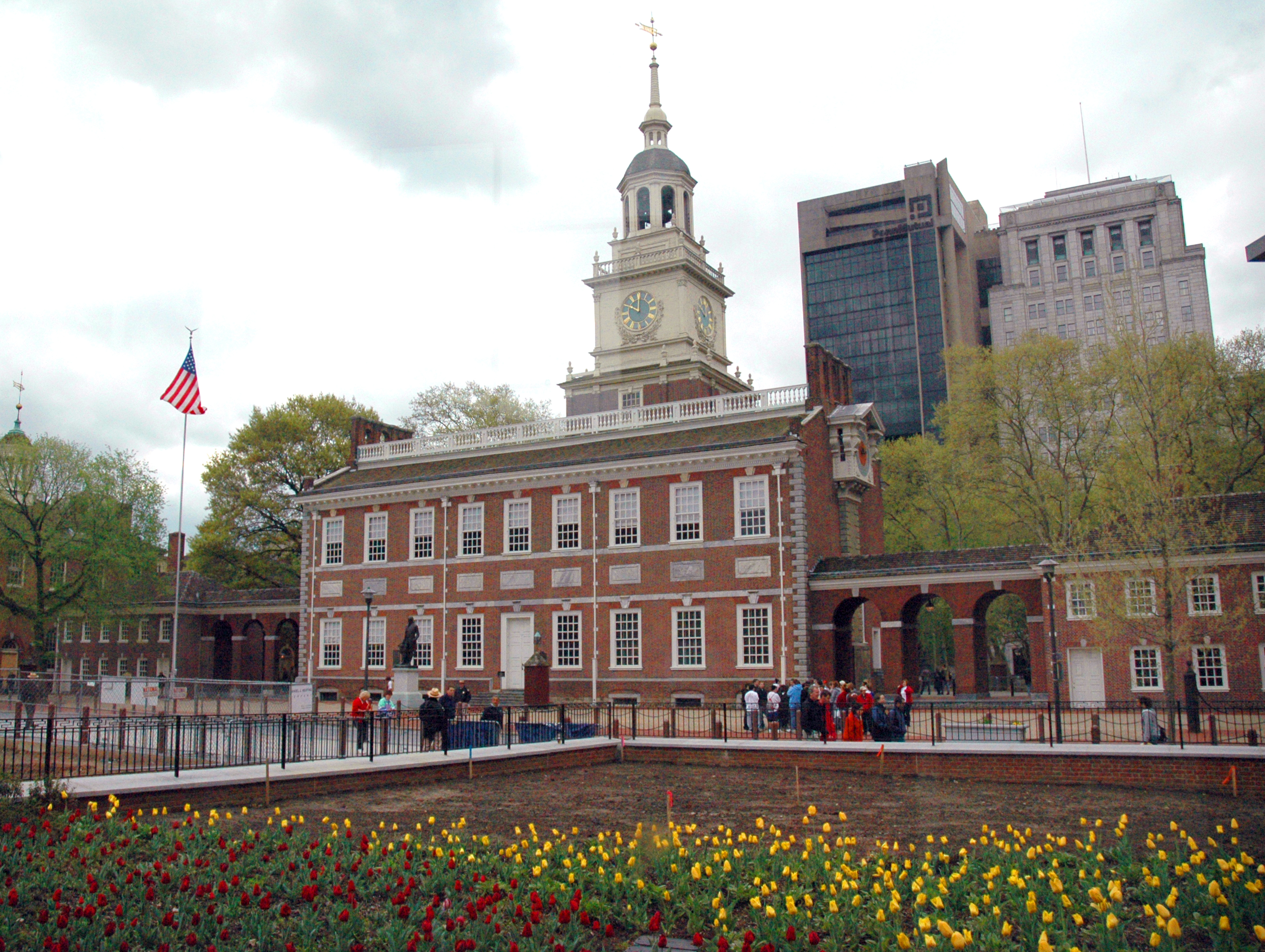
- Exterior of Independence Hall

- Location in Philadelphia Location in Pennsylvania Location in the United States
- 39°56′56″N 75°9′0″W
- Location: 520 Chestnut Street (between 5th and 6th Streets), Philadelphia, Pennsylvania, U.S.

History
- Built: 1753; 273 years ago

Site notes
- Architect(s): Edmund Woolley (original drafts) William Strickland (steeple, 1828)
- Architectural style: Georgian
- Governing body: National Park Service
- Visitors: 645,564 (in 2005)
- Website: nps.gov/inde

UNESCO World Heritage Site
- Type: Cultural
- Criteria: vi
- Designated: 1979 (3rd session)
- Reference no.: 78
- Region: Europe and North America

U.S. National Historic Landmark District – Contributing property
- Designated: October 15, 1966
- Part of: Independence National Historical Park
- Reference no.: 66000683

Independence Hall is a historic civic building in Philadelphia, Pennsylvania, where both the Declaration of Independence and the Constitution of the United States were debated and adopted by the Founding Fathers of the United States. The building, which is the centerpiece of Independence National Historical Park, was designated a World Heritage Site in 1979. It is an example of American Georgian architecture, which is characterized by symmetry, classical proportions, and exposed brick with stone masonry accents.

Independence Hall, which was initially called Pennsylvania State House, was completed in 1753. It was the first capitol of the colonial era Province of Pennsylvania and, even then, was seen as "the greatest ornament in the town". The building became a symbol of liberty, democracy, and the founding of the United States. During the American Revolutionary War, the Second Continental Congress convened in the building from 1775 to 1781. They founded the Continental Army there on June 14, 1775, and the Declaration of Independence was adopted there on July 4, 1776. From May 25 to September 17, 1787, the Pennsylvania State House hosted the Constitutional Convention, where the U.S. Constitution was debated, drafted, and ratified.

The Pennsylvania Supreme Court chamber was housed in the building from 1743 to 1799, when the state capital moved to Lancaster. From 1789, Independence Hall also housed the United States District Court for the District of Pennsylvania. The Supreme Court of the United States held its first two sessions in the building. The building remained in use as a municipal courthouse until 1875, when its court chamber was converted to a museum in preparation for the nation's centennial.

In 1824, the building was renamed the Hall of Independence when it hosted the Marquis de Lafayette. In 1915, former U.S. president William Howard Taft presided over a convention at Independence Hall, where the League to Enforce Peace was formed.

The National Park, of which Independence Hall is a part, surrounds it and acts as a buffer zone between the building and the modern urban fabric. Independence Hall is being protected by security screening building entrance. The most significant pressures on the authenticity of the property relate to the large number of visitors, the degradation of the building due to air pollution and acid rain, and commercial development in the vicinity.

== Legal framework ==
Both the Declaration of Independence, 1776, and the Constitution of the United States, 1787, were discussed, adopted, and signed at this building. As a result, it became a symbol of American freedom and democracy and a very important step in the American history that later had significant impacts on lawmakers, political thinkers and governmental charters around the world. This fact gave the building a direct association with events and ideas of outstanding universal significance fulfilling the criterion (vi) and designating it into a UNESCO World Heritage Site in 1979.

The site is managed, as a part of Independence National Historical Park, at a national level by the National Park Service Organic Act of 1916, which united the individual national parks' management and aims for the preservation of historic sites for public enjoyment and education for future generations.

The 1948 law, by President Harry S. Truman, created the Independence National Historical Park consisting of the Independence Hall, Congress Hall, the Liberty Bell, and other historic buildings important to the nation. This inclusion increased the protection level and the World Heritage Status of Independence Hall to the highest level as the National Park system is maintained by the federal government.

The National Historic Preservation Act of 1966 provides a framework for the preservation of historic properties and encourages federal agencies to consider the effects of their undertakings on historic sites. "Access at all reasonable times to all public portions of the property," and that "no changes or alterations should be made in...its buildings and grounds... except by mutual agreement between the Secretary of the Interior and the [City of Philadelphia]..."

The comprehensive General Management Plan for Independence National Historical Park, developed by the National Park Service, addresses interpretation, visitor management, conservation efforts, carrying capacity issues, and the maintenance of the site's historical integrity. They organize the balance between public access and the protection of the building's physical and historical resources.

Sustaining integrity, authenticity and the outstanding universal value of the building, as UNESCO also indicates, will require managing the degradation due to environmental factors like pollutants, and anthropogenic factors like the number of visitors, urban development plans and the level of interventions which are limited to structural stabilization.

== Preparation for construction ==
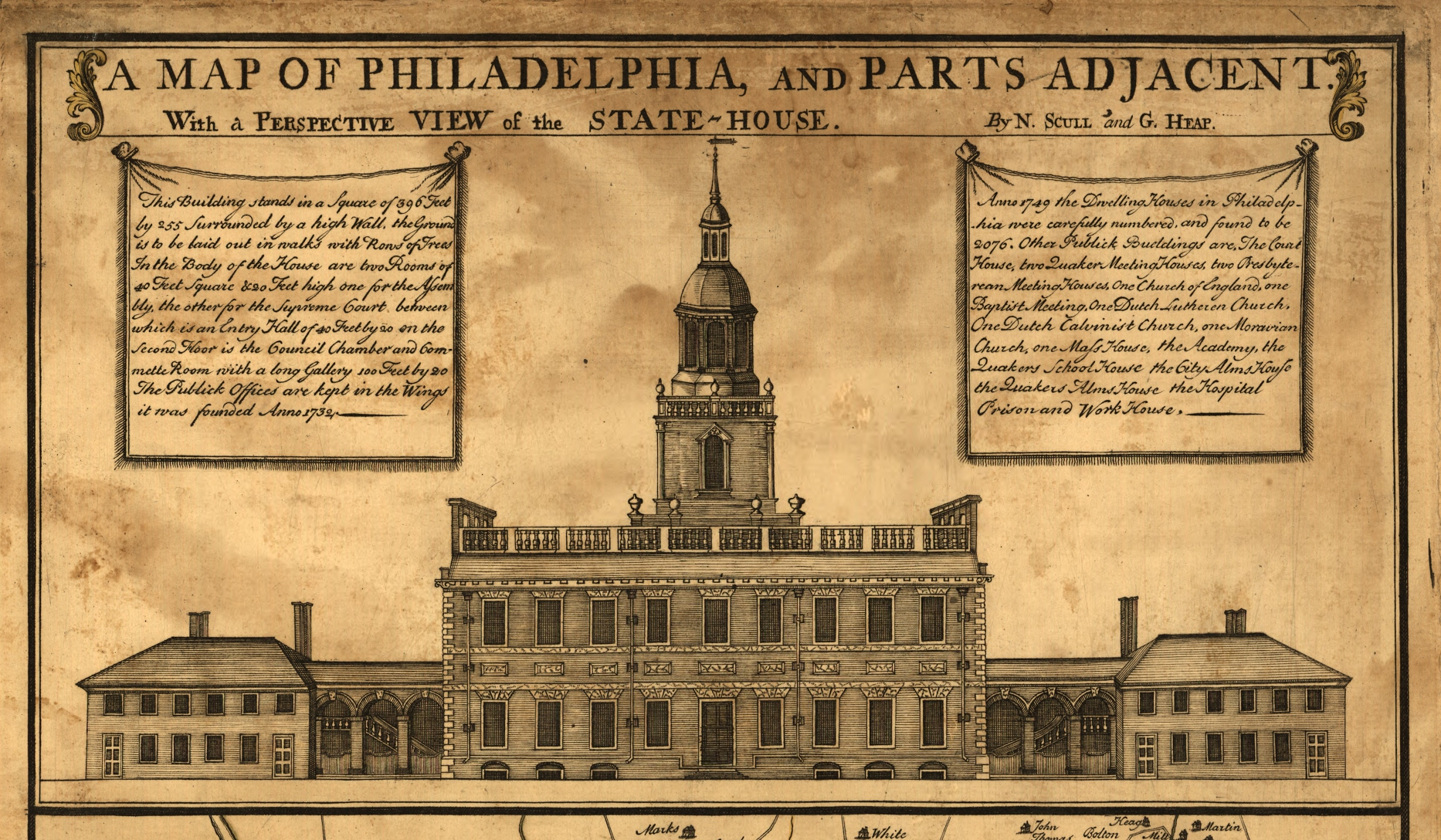
Map of Philadelphia and Parts Adjacent, a 1752 illustration of Pennsylvania State House and its original bell tower, whose clock was not yet added

In spring 1729, proposals were submitted to build a state house in Philadelphia, then the capital of the Province of Pennsylvania. Approximately 2,000 pounds sterling was committed to the project, and a committee including Thomas Lawrence, John Kearsley, and Andrew Hamilton was charged with selecting a site for the building's construction, acquiring plans for it, and contracting a company for its construction. Hamilton and his future son-in-law William Allen, who was later chief justice of the Province of Pennsylvania, were named trustees and were authorized to purchase land for the proposed state house. By October 1730, they purchased lots on Chestnut Street for the building. The site was originally a slightly sloping, vegetation covered site at the outskirts of the city which used to be a camp for American Indians. The State House was more suburban than urban.

By 1732, Hamilton acquired the deed for Lot no. 2 from surveyor David Powell, who was paid for his work on the lot. But tensions began arising among committee members. Kearsley and Hamilton disagreed on a number of issues concerning the state house. Kearsley, who designed Christ Church and St. Peter's Church in Philadelphia, had plans for the design, but so did Hamilton. The two men also disagreed on where in Philadelphia the building should be located; Kearsley sought to have it constructed on High Street, which is present-day Market Street, and Hamilton favored Chestnut Street. Lawrence said nothing on the matter of its location.

The disagreements escalated to the point where arbitration was needed. On August 8, 1733, Hamilton brought the matter before the Provincial Assembly, where he explained that Kearsley did not approve of his plans for the state house's location and architecture and argued that the assembly did not agree to these decisions either. Three days later, Hamilton appeared before the assembly, where he showed his plans for the state house, which accepted them. On August 14, the assembly sided with Hamilton, granting him full authority over the project, and the current site on the south side of Chestnut Street between Fifth and Sixth Streets, its current location, the site where it would be constructed. Ground was broken for construction soon after. A foundation of rubble stone and lime mortar was done into the sandy clay soil. Then the interior frame and roof trusses were constructed with wooden girders and beams. They used reinforced joints and iron plates and pins. The outer shell was built from a hard-burned brick of 22 to 23 inches thickness.

== Structure ==
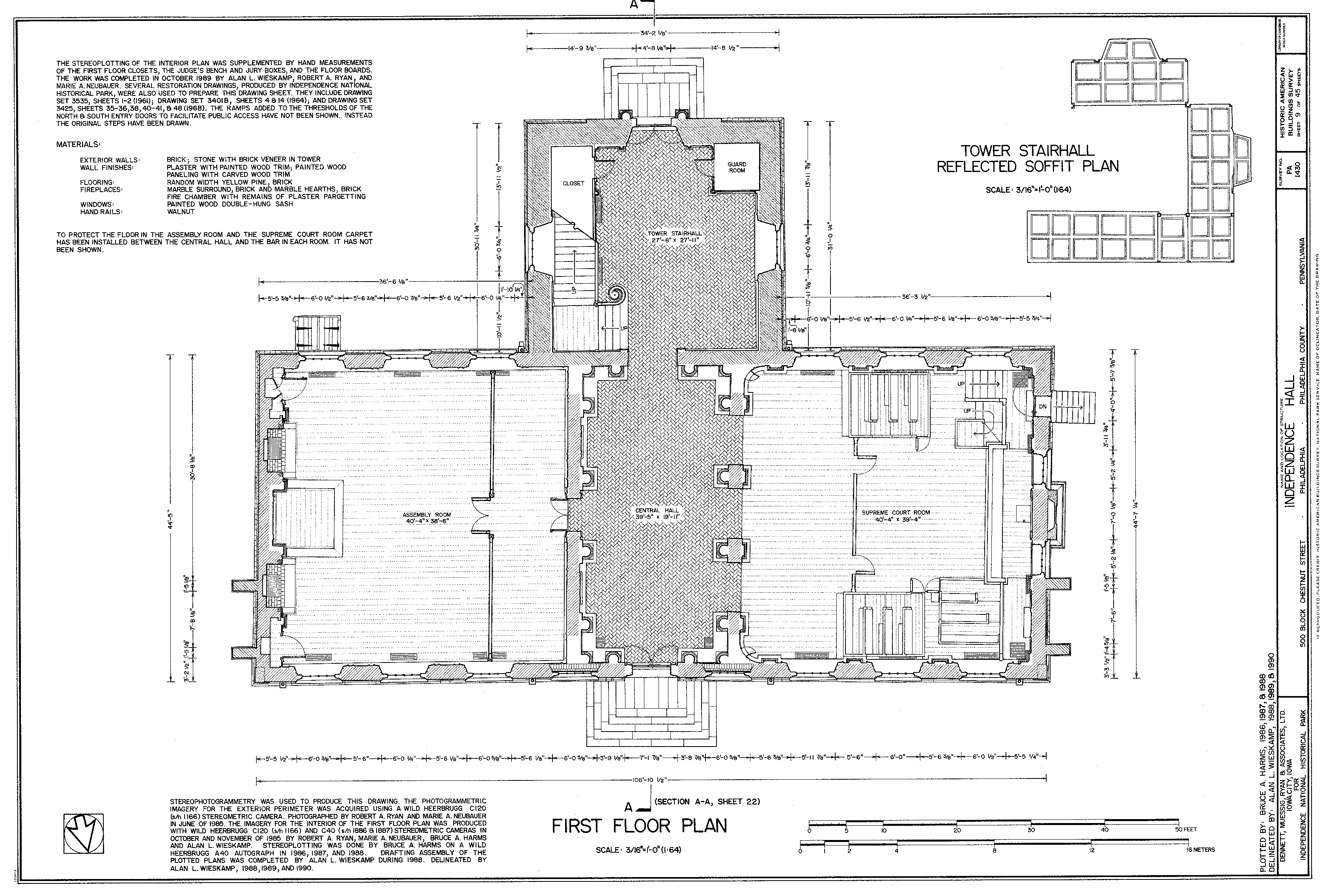
Ground floor of Independence Hall
(right-click links below for room images)

1 / Assembly Room; 2 / Supreme Court Room	3 / Vestibule; 4 / Tower Stair Hall

Independence Hall has a red brick façade, designed in Georgian style. It consists of a central building with belltower and steeple, attached to two smaller wings via arcaded hyphens. The highest point to the tip of the steeple spire is 168 feet 7 1/4 inches (51.391 m) above the ground.

The State House was built between 1732 and 1753, designed by Edmund Woolley and Andrew Hamilton, and built by Woolley. Its construction was commissioned by the Pennsylvania colonial legislature which paid for construction as funds were available, so it was finished piecemeal. It was initially inhabited by the colonial government of Pennsylvania as its State House, from 1732 to 1799.

In 1752, when Isaac Norris was selecting a man to build the first clock for the State House he chose Thomas Stretch, the son of Peter Stretch his old friend and fellow council member, to do the job.

In 1753, Stretch erected a giant clock at the building's west end that resembled a tall clock (grandfather clock). The 40-foot-tall (12 m) limestone base was capped with a 14-foot (4.3 m) wooden case surrounding the clock's face, which was carved by cabinetmaker Samuel Harding. The clock was removed about 1830. The clock's dials were mounted at the east and west ends of the main building connected by rods to the clock movement in the middle of the building. A new clock was designed and installed by Isaiah Lukens in 1828. The Lukens clock ran consecutively for eight days, "with four copper dials on each side that measured eight feet in diameter and clockworks that ensured sufficient power to strike the four-thousand pound bell made by John Wilbank." The Lukens clock remained in Independence Hall until 1877.

The acquisition of the original clock and bell by the Pennsylvania Colonial Assembly is closely related to the acquisition of the Liberty Bell. By mid-1753, the clock was installed in the State House attic, but it was six years before Thomas Stretch received any pay for it.

=== Demolition and reconstruction ===
While the shell of the central portion of the building is original, the side wings, steeple and much of the interior were reconstructed much later. In 1781, the Pennsylvania Assembly had the wooden steeple removed from the main building. The steeple rotted and weakened to a dangerous extent by 1773. By 1781, the Assembly had it removed and had the brick tower covered with a hipped roof. A more elaborate steeple, designed by William Strickland, was added in 1828.

The original wings and hyphens (connecting corridors) were demolished and replaced in 1812. In 1898, these were in turn demolished and replaced with reconstructions of the original wings.

The building was renovated numerous times in the 19th and 20th century. The current interior is a mid-20th-century reconstruction by the National Park Service with the public rooms restored to their 18th-century appearance.

During the summer of 1973, a replica of the Thomas Stretch clock was restored to Independence Hall.

The second-floor Governor's Council Chamber, furnished with important examples of the era by the National Park Service, includes a musical tall case clock made by Peter Stretch, c. 1740, one of the most prominent clockmakers in early America and father of Thomas Stretch.

Two smaller buildings adjoin the wings of Independence Hall: Old City Hall to the east, and Congress Hall to the west. These three buildings are together on a city block known as Independence Square, along with Philosophical Hall, the original home of the American Philosophical Society. Since its construction in the mid-20th century, to the north has been Independence Mall, which includes the current home of the Liberty Bell.

=== Liberty Bell ===
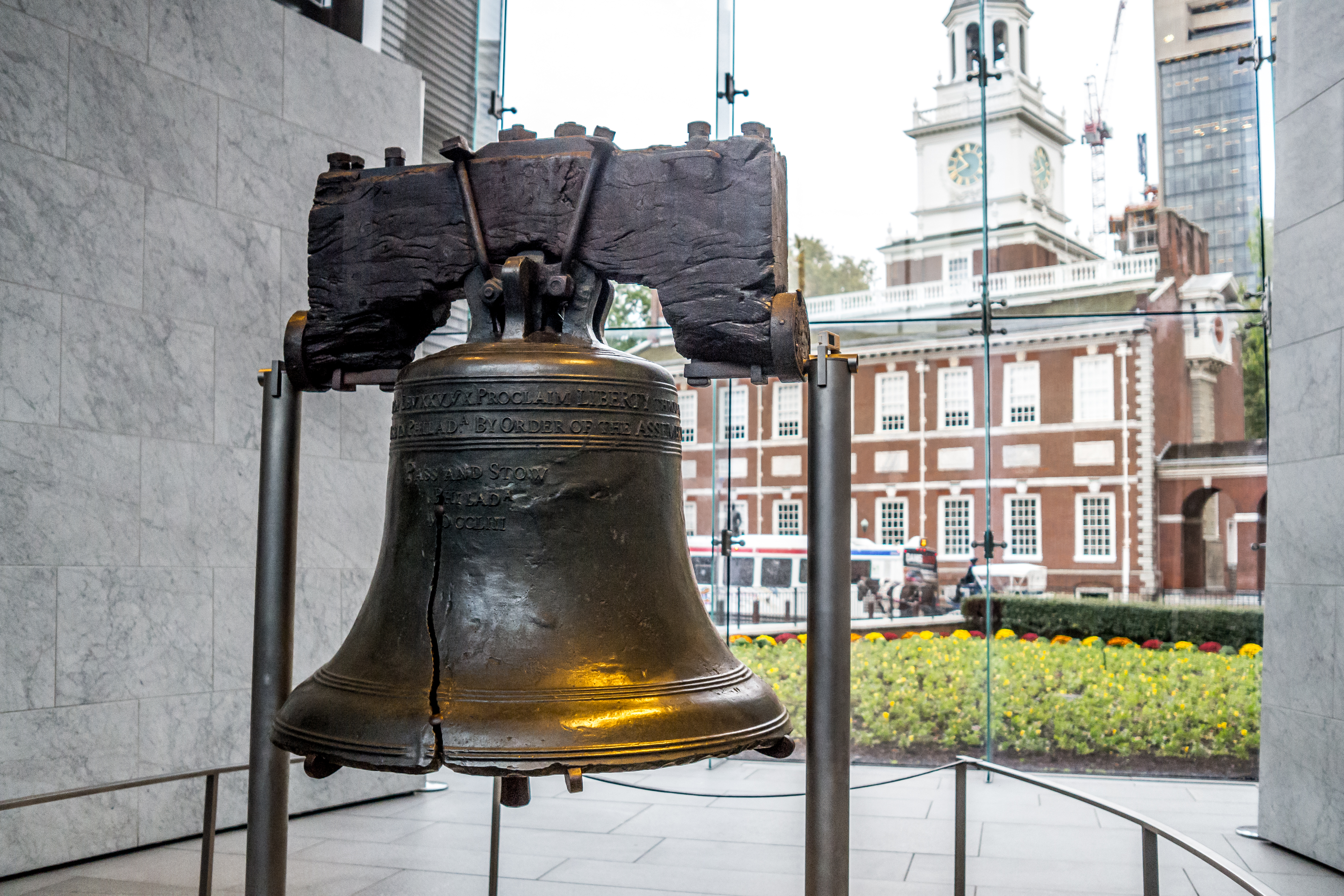
The Liberty Bell (foreground) was housed in the highest chamber of the brick tower from the 1780s until the 1850s

The lowest chamber of the original wooden steeple was the first home of the Liberty Bell. When that steeple was removed in the 1780s, the bell was lowered into the highest chamber of the brick tower, where it remained until the 1850s. The much larger Centennial Bell, created for the Centennial Exposition in Philadelphia in 1876, hangs in the cupola of the 1828 steeple. The Liberty Bell, with its distinctive crack, was displayed on the ground floor of the hall from the 1850s until 1976, and is now on display across the street in the Liberty Bell Center.

=== Assembly Room ===
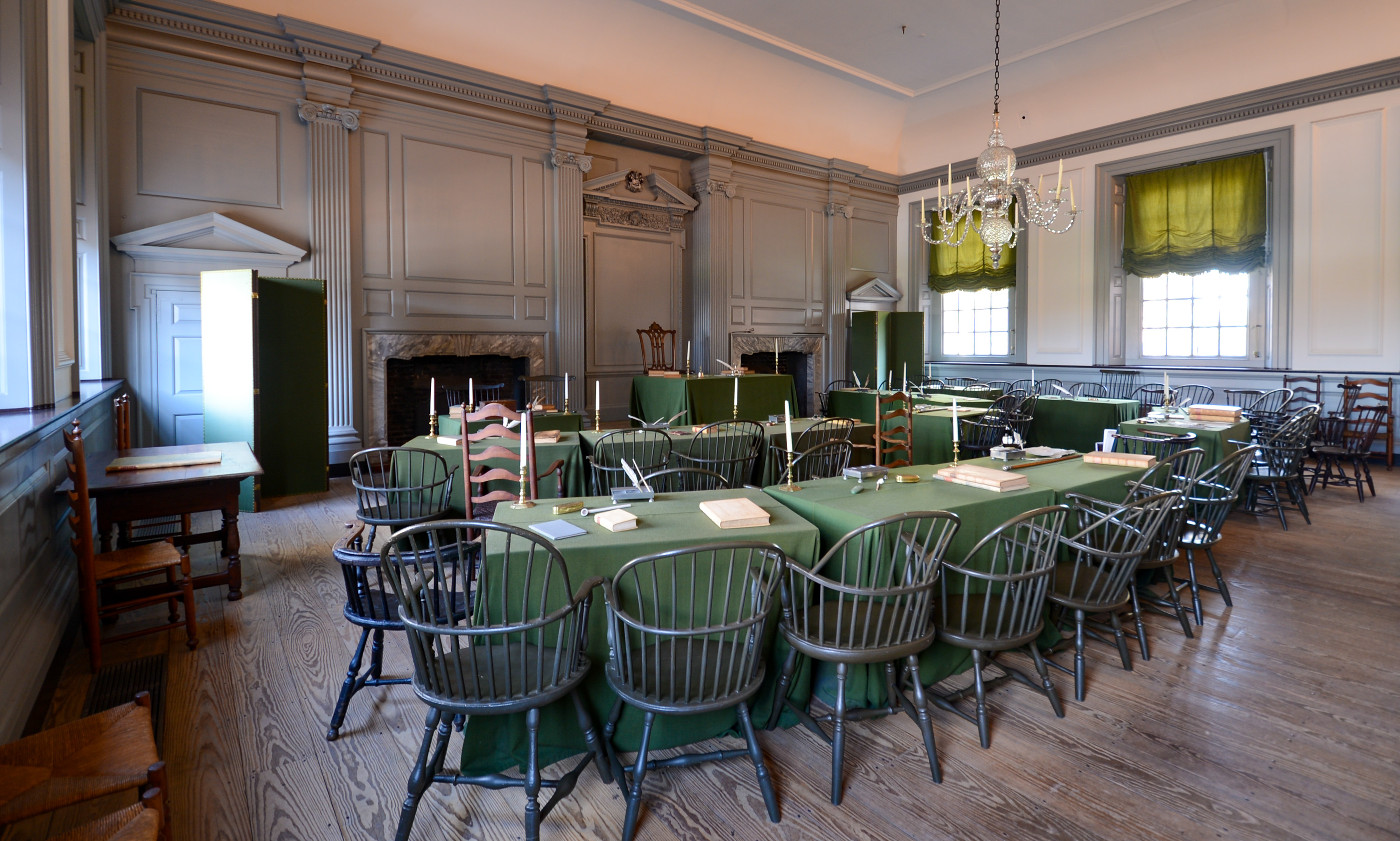
The Assembly Room, where the Declaration of Independence and Constitution were both authored and adopted in 1776 and 1787, respectively

The Assembly Room is the heart of Independence Hall, and is the room where the Declaration of Independence and the Constitution were signed.

== Historical events ==
The history of the Independence Hall can be divided into four periods: first construction and function as the Pennsylvania State House from 1732 to 1799, used as a museum from 1802 to 1828, became a municipal building from 1818 to 1895, and turned into an important historical landmark from 1898 to present.

=== Declaration of Independence and Second Continental Congress ===
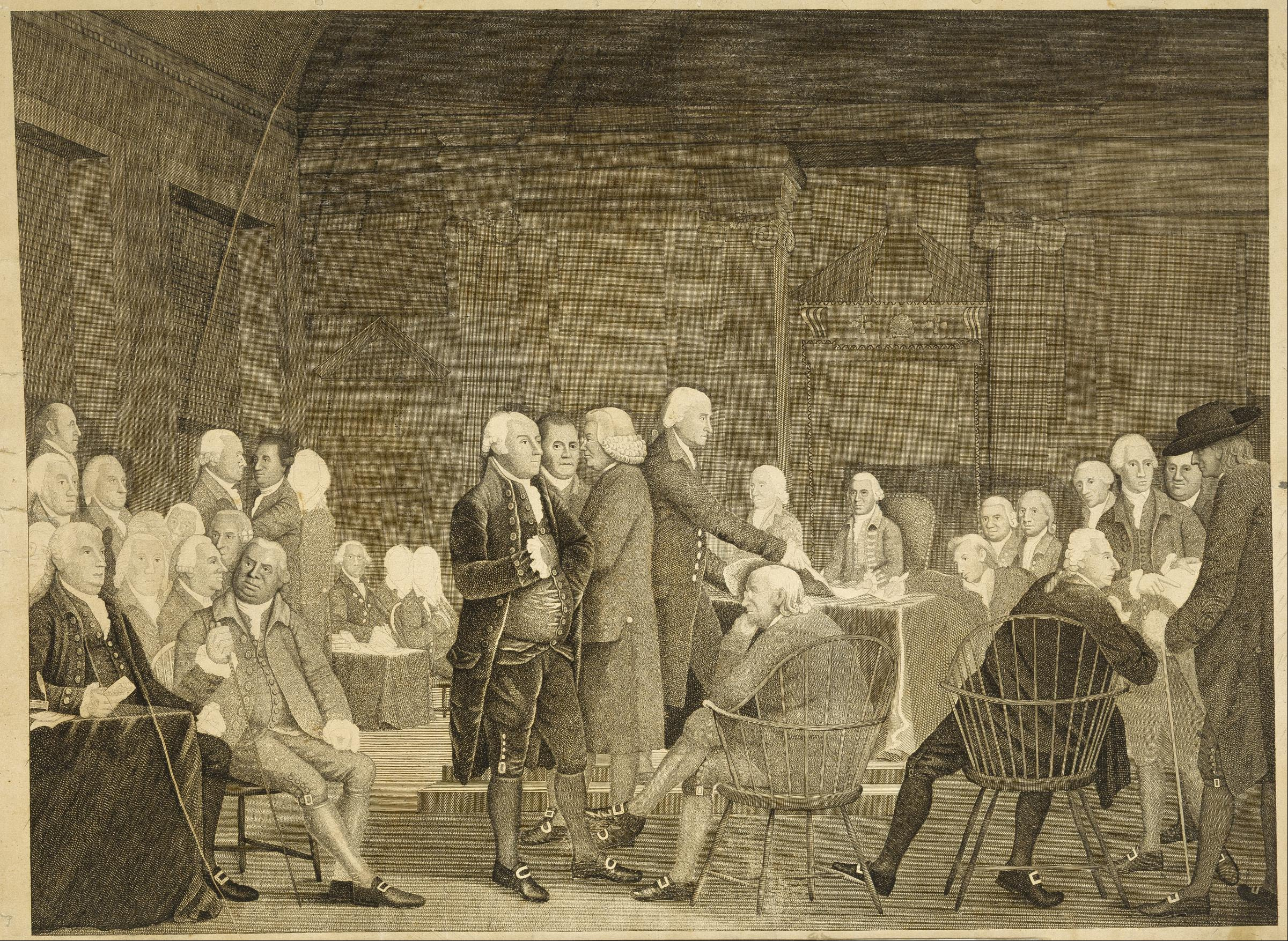
Congress Voting Independence, a 1795 portrait by Robert Edge Pine depicting the Assembly Room in present-day Independence Hall during the American Revolution

From May 10, 1775, to 1783, the Pennsylvania State House served as the principal meeting place of the Second Continental Congress, a body of representatives from each of the thirteen British North American colonies.

On June 14, 1775, delegates of the Continental Congress, gathered in the Assembly Room of the Pennsylvania State House, established the Continental Army and appointed George Washington. The Congress appointed Benjamin Franklin as the first Postmaster General of what later became the United States Post Office Department slightly over a month later, on July 26.

On July 2, 1776, the Second Continental Congress voted on the Lee Resolution and declared independence from Britain, and two days later, on July 4, the final wording of the Declaration of Independence was formally adopted and signed in present-day Independence Hall. The Declaration was read aloud to the public in the area now known as Independence Square. This document unified the colonies in North America who declared themselves independent of the Kingdom of Great Britain and explained their justifications for doing so. These historic events are celebrated annually with a national holiday for U.S. Independence Day. There are 56 signatures on the Declaration of Independence, including John Hancock who signed first, writing his name in very large letters. The prominence of this signature led to the term "John Hancock" or "Hancock" becoming a colloquial term in the United States for one's signature.

The Congress continued to meet in the Pennsylvania State House until December 12, 1776, when Congress was forced to evacuate Philadelphia during the British occupation of Philadelphia. During the British occupation of Philadelphia, the Continental Congress met in Baltimore, Maryland from December 20, 1776, to February 27, 1777. The Congress returned to Philadelphia from March 4, 1777, to September 18, 1777.

In September 1777, the British again moved to occupy Philadelphia, once again forcing the Continental Congress to abandon Philadelphia. The Congress then met in Lancaster, Pennsylvania, for a day on September 27, 1777, and then in York, Pennsylvania, for nine months from September 30, 1777, to June 27, 1778, where the Articles of Confederation were approved in November 1777. The Second Continental Congress then returned to Independence Hall, for its final meetings, from July 2, 1778, to March 1, 1781.

Under the Articles of Confederation, the Congress of the Confederation initially met in Independence Hall, from March 1, 1781, to June 21, 1783. (Note: During this time period, American diplomats were negotiating the terms of peace with the Great Britain. See: Peace of Paris (1783)#Treaty with the United States of America. Based on preliminary articles made on November 30, 1782, and approved by the Congress of the Confederation on April 15, 1783, the Treaty of Paris was signed on September 3, 1783, and ratified by Congress on January 14, 1784, formally ending the American Revolutionary War between the Kingdom of Great Britain and the thirteen former colonies which on July 4, 1776, formed the United States of America.) Following the Pennsylvania Mutiny of 1783, Congress moved from Philadelphia again in June 1783, convening in Princeton, New Jersey, and eventually in several other cities prior to completion of the national capital of Washington, D.C. in 1800.

=== U.S. Constitutional Convention ===
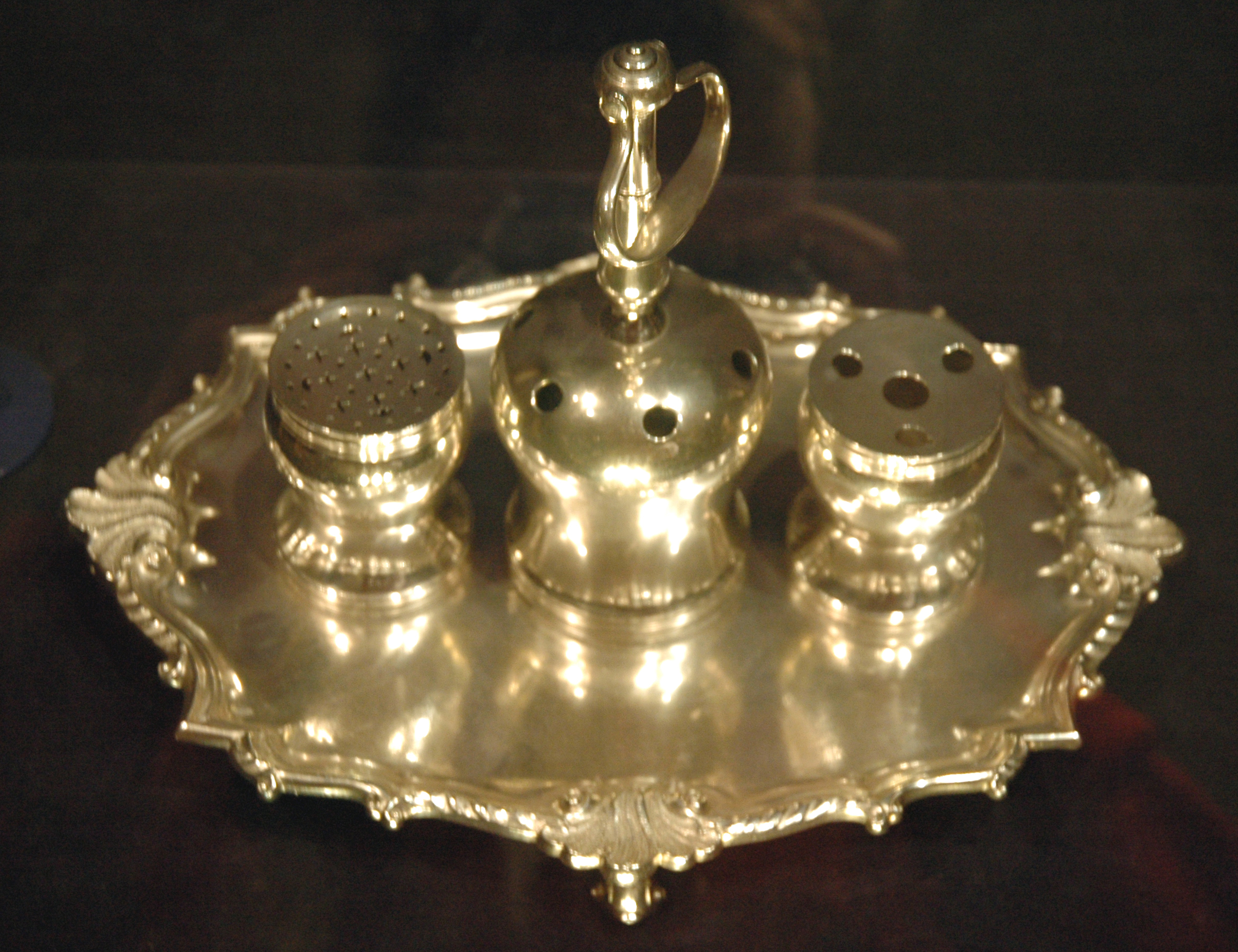
The Syng inkstand, used at both the signing of the Declaration of Independence and the U.S. Constitution

In September 1786, commissioners from five states met in the Annapolis Convention to discuss adjustments to the Articles of Confederation that would improve commerce. They invited state representatives to convene in Philadelphia to discuss improvements to the federal government. After debate, the Congress of the Confederation endorsed the plan to revise the Articles of Confederation on February 21, 1787. Twelve states, Rhode Island being the exception, accepted this invitation and sent delegates to convene in June 1787 at the building (then still referred to as the Pennsylvania State House).

The resolution calling the Convention specified its purpose as proposing amendments to the Articles, but the Convention decided to propose a rewritten Constitution. The Philadelphia Convention voted to keep deliberations secret, and to keep the Hall's windows shut throughout the hot summer. The result was the drafting of a new fundamental government design. On September 17, 1787, the Constitution was completed, and took effect on March 4, 1789, when the new Congress met for the first time in New York's Federal Hall.

Article One, Section Eight, of the United States Constitution granted Congress the authority to create a federal district to serve as the national capital. Following the ratification of the Constitution, the Congress, while meeting in New York, passed the Residence Act of 1790, which established the District of Columbia as the new federal capital. However, a representative from Pennsylvania, Robert Morris, did manage to convince Congress to return to Philadelphia while the new permanent capital was being built. As a result, the Residence Act also declared Philadelphia to be the temporary capital for a period of ten years. The Congress moved back into Philadelphia on December 6, 1790, and met at Congress Hall, an adjacent building, until moving to Washington, D.C., in 1800.

=== Funerary procession of Abraham Lincoln ===
Following the assassination of Abraham Lincoln, the nation's 16th president, Lincoln's body and the disinterred coffin of his son Willie, who predeceased him in 1862, were taken by train from Washington, D.C., to Springfield, Illinois, for burial. The train route essentially retraced the 1,654-mile (2,662 km) route Lincoln traveled en route to the nation's capital as president-elect in 1861 with the removal of stops in Pittsburgh and Cincinnati and the addition of Chicago. The train left Washington, D.C. for Baltimore at 8:00 am on April 21, 1865.

Lincoln's funeral train, known as the "Lincoln Special", left Harrisburg, Pennsylvania, on Saturday, April 22, 1865, at 11:15 am and arrived at Philadelphia at Broad Street Station that afternoon at 4:30 pm. It was carried by hearse past a crowd of 85,000 people and was held in state in the Assembly Room in the east wing of Independence Hall. While there, it was escorted and guarded by a detail of 27 naval and military officers. That evening, a private viewing was arranged for honored guests of the mourners. The next day, (Sunday, April 23, 1865) lines began forming at 5:00 am. Over 300,000 mourners viewed the body – some waiting 5 hours just to see him. The Lincoln Special left Philadelphia's Kensington Station for New York City the next morning, on Monday, April 24, 1865, at 4:00 am.

=== League to Enforce Peace ===
The symbolic use of the hall was illustrated on June 17, 1915, where the League to Enforce Peace was formed here with former President William Howard Taft presiding. They proposed an international governing body under which participating nations would commit to "jointly...use...their economic and military forces against any one of their number making war against another" and "to formulate and codify rules of international law".

== Preservation ==
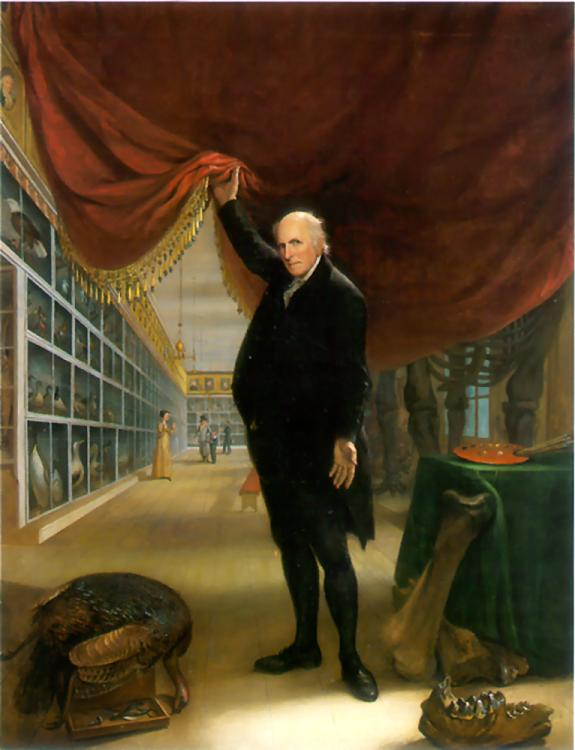
The Artist in His Museum, an 1822 self-portrait by Charles Willson Peale depicting his museum at Pennsylvania State House, now Independence Hall, with the Long Room in the background

The original steeple was demolished in 1781 due to structural problems. The wings and hyphens were demolished in 1812 and replaced by larger buildings designed by architect Robert Mills and a new, more elaborate steeple designed by William Strickland, constructed in 1828. The north entrance was also rebuilt during this period.

From 1802 to 1827, artist Charles Willson Peale housed his Philadelphia Museum of natural history specimens, including the skeleton of a mastodon, and portraits of famous Americans, on the second floor of the Old State House and in the Assembly Room.

In early 1816, the Commonwealth of Pennsylvania sold the State House to the City of Philadelphia, with a contract signed by the governor. The deed, however, was not transferred until more than two years later. Philadelphia has owned the State House and its associated buildings and grounds since that time.

The city wanted to restore the building to its original state during the American Revolution in 1826. Using the original drawings as a guide, T. Mellon Rogers attempted a restoration. While the second-floor partitions were repositioned accurately enough, elements of architectural decor were highly inaccurate. In the Supreme Court Chamber, he removed the original entablature to lower the ceiling. He tore down the Mills buildings and replaced them with incorrectly proportioned imitations of the 1735 structures. The work of 1897–98, as the first overall restoration, happened upon but failed to record and interpret physical evidence of the past correctly. Today's wing buildings and arcades remain from this restoration. So, in 1898, the Mills wings were removed and replaced with replicas of the originals, but the Strickland steeple was left in place.

In 1948, the building's interior was restored to its original appearance. Independence National Historical Park was established by the 80th U.S. Congress later that year to preserve historical sites associated with the American Revolution. Independence National Historical Park comprises a landscaped area of four city blocks, as well as outlying sites that include Independence Square, Carpenters' Hall (meeting place of the First Continental Congress), the site of Benjamin Franklin's home, the reconstructed Graff House (where Thomas Jefferson wrote the Declaration of Independence), City Tavern (center of Revolutionary War activities), restored period residences, and several early banks. The park also holds the Liberty Bell, Franklin's desk, the Syng inkstand, a portrait gallery, gardens, and libraries. A product of extensive documentary research and archaeology by the federal government, the restoration of Independence Hall and other buildings in the park set standards for other historic preservation and stimulated rejuvenation of old Philadelphia. The site, administered by the National Park Service, is listed as a World Heritage Site by UNESCO (joining only three other U.S. man-made monuments still in use, the others being the Statue of Liberty, Pueblo de Taos, and the combined site of the University of Virginia and Monticello).

The Assembly Room was restored to its historic appearance when the Declaration of Independence and the US Constitution were debated and signed. This project, which set the framework and standards of historic preservation was the most complex one the National Park Service in Philadelphia had taken upon. Throughout the years the room had its wood paneling, furnishings, and paint colors altered many times leading to a loss of its originality. Portraits of Founding members and relics of the Revolutionary and the cracked liberty bell were added on the walls too. The sources to understand how the room's original state looked like were receipts, books, diaries, and letters from that time. Especially the 1780s painting of 'Congress Voting Independence' was the most important key source in terms of showing this. The furnishings that were seen from these sources were completed in 1955. In terms of the architectural details, the work was done precisely. The paint that was done through decades of using the room was scraped off to determine the original colors and reveal the architectural details. As the wooden peelings were taken off, the nails were inspected and the fact that they were wrought iron nails indicated they were from the 18th century. This stripping of wooden peeling revealed the original 1730s brick walls. These scrapings, peelings and investigations helped to uncover important details about the original case. Assembly Room's east wall's last remaining element of the original woodwork in which the paint fragments revealed the original color of the paint. The original ceiling structure without the plaster, locations, dimensions and shapes of the window, fireplace and door openings, three original floor joints in which the original width was seen from the nail patterns, original width of the wood paneling from the nailing blocks on the revealed brick walls, and original cornice's appearance and dimensions from a single wooden dentil that was uncovered. According to all these findings the room was structured back to its original state by installing wood paneling, applying decorative plaster and painting the wall in its original color. The restoration of the Assembly Room, which is considered one of the most accurate historic renovations in the United States, was finished in 1965. Overall, there was minimum intervention where only necessary changes were made to reveal and preserve the original features. New materials were distinguishable from the original elements and used only when replacements were necessary. The restored elements were compatible with the original design and materials. And the restorations were done in a reversible manner so that future changes could be made without damaging the original materials.

The tower and the steeple were added in 1750. The original wooden tower was removed in 1781 even though it was distinguished that it has rotten in 1773. So, in 1828 as the city was restoring the building to its original state, William Strickland was hired to restore the original steeple. Instead of following the original design, he incorporated a clock and additional ornamentation. Currently, most of the original wood and brick are remaining. The steeple was strengthened by installing a new internal steel tower designed to fit within the framework of the historic timber structure in the 20th century for the tower's stability by Structural engineering firm Keast & Hood after core sampling and non-destructive stress testing. However, the tower suffered from water infiltration, and weather conditions leading to wood decay, rusting of iron components and deterioration. The structural framing of Stricklands design was revealed in the process of removing the tower's exterior during the repair and restoration of the tower from 2010 to 2012 by the American Recovery and Reinvestment Act. Some wood and nails and damaged brick masonry were replaced, the window sashes, doors, frames, and doors were restored and repainted, glass faces of the clock were replaced, building elevations were braced, historic copper urns were refurbished, new flashings was installed and caulking administered to prevent water infiltration, more modern lighting protection system technology was added, new wooden roofing shingles were installed, and supporting weathervane structures were replaced with gold leaf. The restoration overall had minimum interventions and preserved as much original material as possible. New materials and interventions were distinguishable and compatible with the original historic fabric. They also allowed future modifications to be made if necessary, showing reversibility. So, the tower's integrity was restored, ensuring its preservation for future generations.

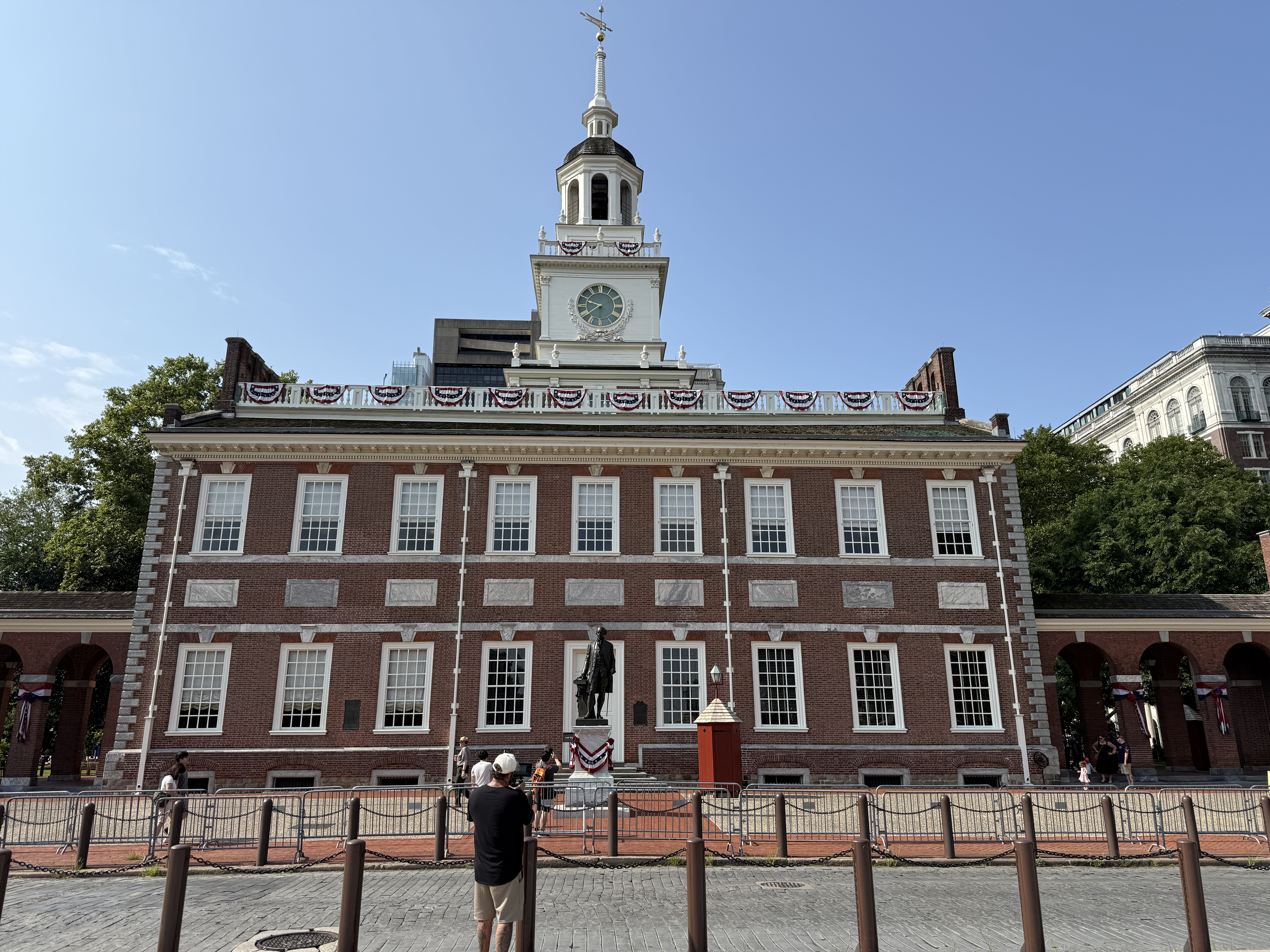
Independence Hall in July 2026

From 2017 to 2018 the North facade's stonework was taken under restoration, by the Tradesmen Group LLC who was selected by the National Park Service, due to weathering and environmental factors. The restoration included repointing of failed and deficient mortar joints in brick and stone masonry, repairing and patching the damaged stone fractures, cleaning soiled masonry using specialized poultice treatments, limited stone replacement with matching materials for compatibility, installing new lead sheet flashing on window keystones, and replacing the iron stone cramps in the North entrance stone steps with new molten lead. Again, minimum interventions were done on the most necessary elements. The new materials introduced were distinguishable and compatible with the original ones. And the process was done in a reversible manner as much as it can be. As a result, the facade's structural integrity was restored, enhancing both its appearance and durability.

The bell that was once used at the clock tower became too fragile to use so it was named the Liberty Bell and put on display in Liberty Hall's foyer. Instead of repairing it, it was being showcased in its current state. Independence Hall and the Liberty Bell are now protected in a secure zone with entry at security screening buildings. Following the September 11, 2001 attacks, as part of a national effort to safeguard historical monuments by the United States Department of Homeland Security, pedestrian traffic around Independence Square and part of Independence Mall was restricted by temporary bicycle barriers and park rangers. In 2006, the National Park Service proposed installing a seven-foot security fence around Independence Hall and bisecting Independence Square, a plan that met with opposition from Philadelphia city officials, Pennsylvania Governor Ed Rendell, and Senator Arlen Specter. As of January 2007, the National Park Service plan was revised to eliminate the fence in favor of movable bollards and chains, and also to remove at least some of the temporary barriers to pedestrians and visitors.

There is an ongoing restoration project called the Independence Square Improvement Project that started in 2025 and planned to finish in 2026 by the National Park Service, Historic Preservation Training Center and the Historic Architecture, Conservation and Engineering Center. It includes the Independence Hall, Congress Hall and the Old City Hall. Enhancing the accessibility and rehabilitating the building for the 250th anniversary of the Declaration of Independence which it symbolizes alongside the main concept of preserving the historic structure is the main purpose behind this project. In terms of accessibility new ramps are being designed and constructed. Masonry, monument, interior and exterior wood element restorations are also under work. The interior plaster is being repaired, and the metal finishes are being preserved. According to old sources and investigations historically accurate paint finishes are being applied to the ceilings, walls and trim. All of these will be done with minimum interventions that are distinguishable, compatible and reversible to preserve the integrity of the historic fabric and enhance the visitor experience.

In general, increased number of visitors and environmental pollutants, such as acid rain, have contributed to the degradation of the building's materials. The large number of visitors and surrounding urban development have also posed challenges to the site's preservation. The National Park Service has implemented measures to manage visitor impact, including visitor screening and enhanced security systems. Additionally, a drainage improvement project was undertaken to address water accumulation issues in Independence Square, which could affect the building's foundation.

== Legacy ==
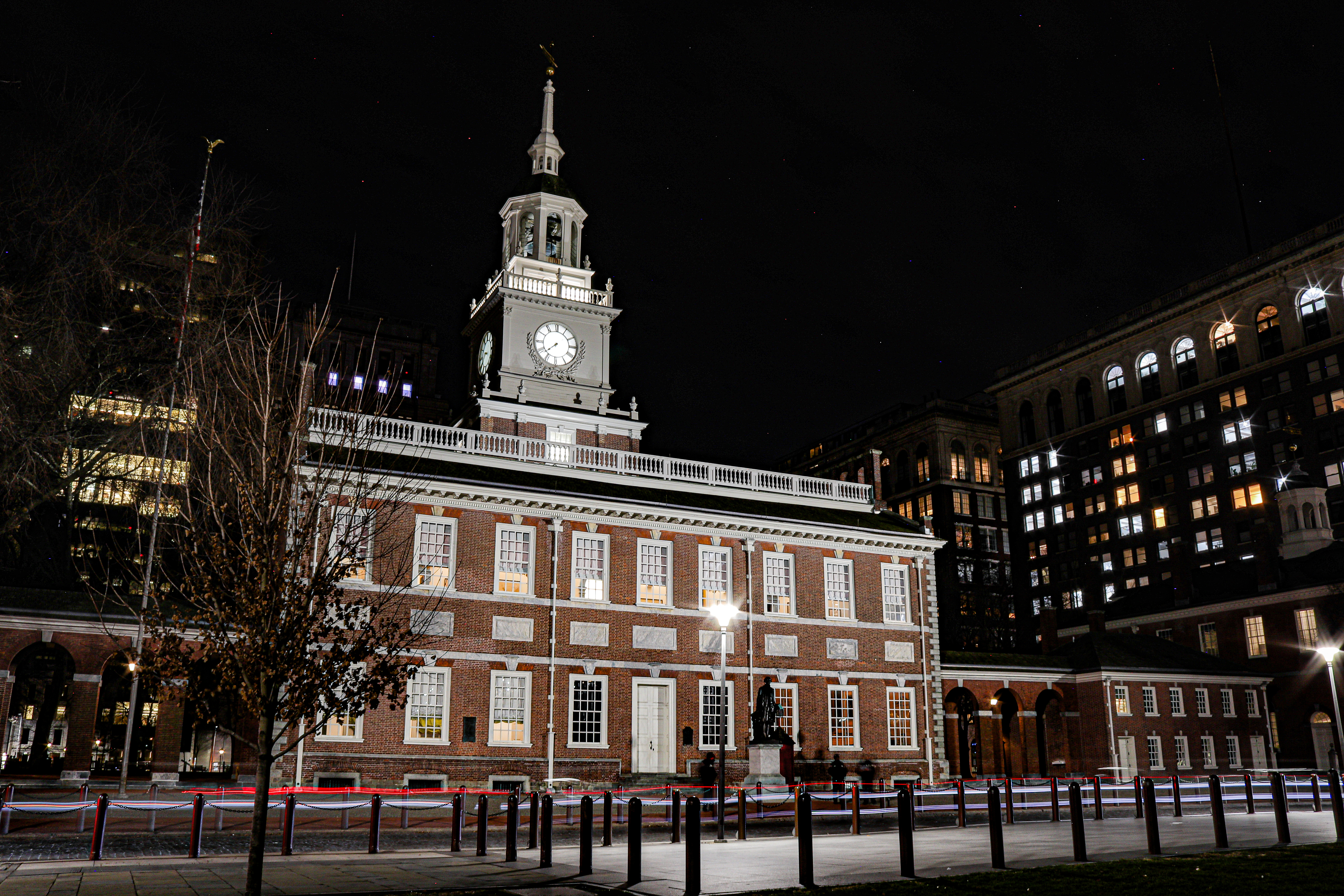
Independence Hall at night in January 2023

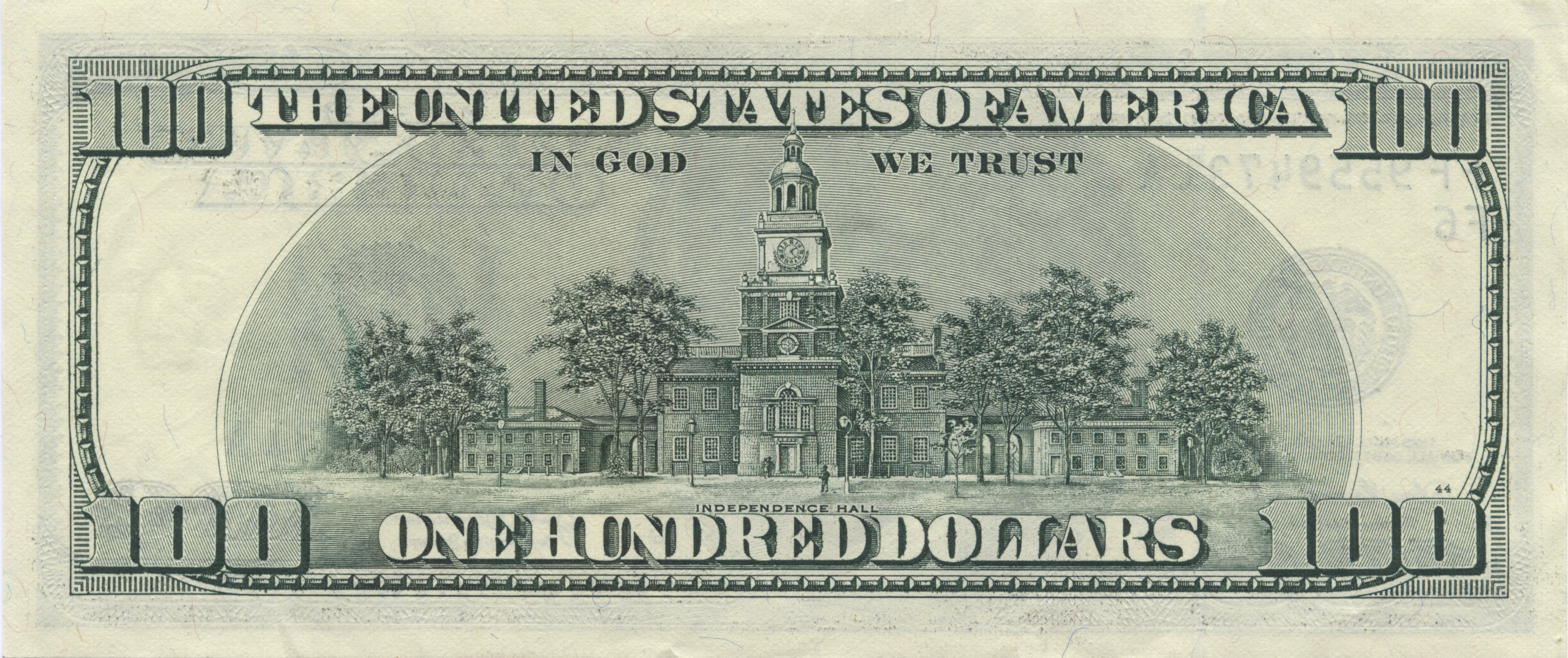
The reverse of the U.S. $100 bill, which has portrayed Independence Hall since 1928

On July 16, 1987, Congress met at Independence Hall in an unprecedented joint meeting outside of Washington, to commemorate the 200th anniversary of the Connecticut Compromise that determined the structure of Congress during the Constitutional Convention.

The 1989 film A More Perfect Union, which portrays the events of the 1787 Constitutional Convention, was largely filmed in Independence Hall.

Because of its symbolic history, Independence Hall has been used in more recent times as a venue for speeches and protests in support of democratic and civil rights movements. On October 26, 1918, Tomáš Masaryk proclaimed the independence of Czechoslovakia on the steps of Independence Hall. National Freedom Day, which commemorates the struggles of African Americans for equality and justice, has been celebrated at Independence Hall since 1942. On Independence Day, July 4, 1962, President John F. Kennedy gave an address there.

Annual demonstrations organized by the East Coast Homophile Organizations advocating for gay rights were held in front of Independence Hall each July 4 from 1965 to 1969.

Independence Hall has been pictured on the back of the U.S. $100 bill since 1928, and was depicted on the 1975–76 bicentennial Kennedy half dollar. The Assembly Room is pictured on the reverse of the U.S. two-dollar bill, from the original John Trumbull portrait, Declaration of Independence.

=== Replicas ===
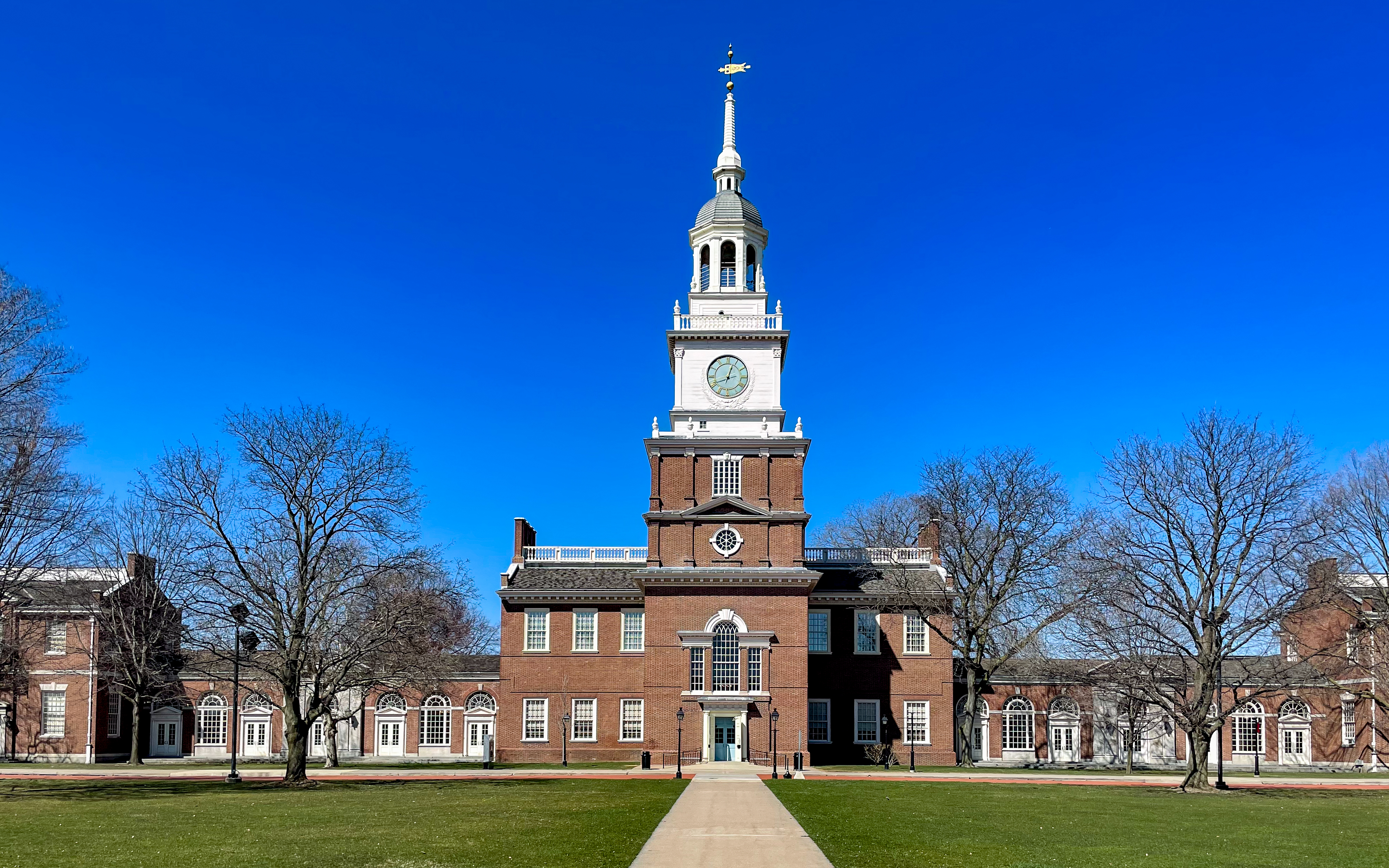
The clock tower at The Henry Ford in Dearborn, Michigan, one of several replicas of Independence Hall

Independence Hall served as the model for the Pennsylvania Building at the 1893 World's Columbian Exposition, the Pennsylvania Building at the 1907 Jamestown Exposition, and the Pennsylvania Pavilion at the 1939 New York World's Fair. Dozens of structures replicating or loosely inspired by Independence Hall's iconic design have been built elsewhere in the United States, including a brick-by-brick replica across from Knott's Berry Farm in Buena Park, California.

Independence Hall in 1799, with the wooden steeple removed

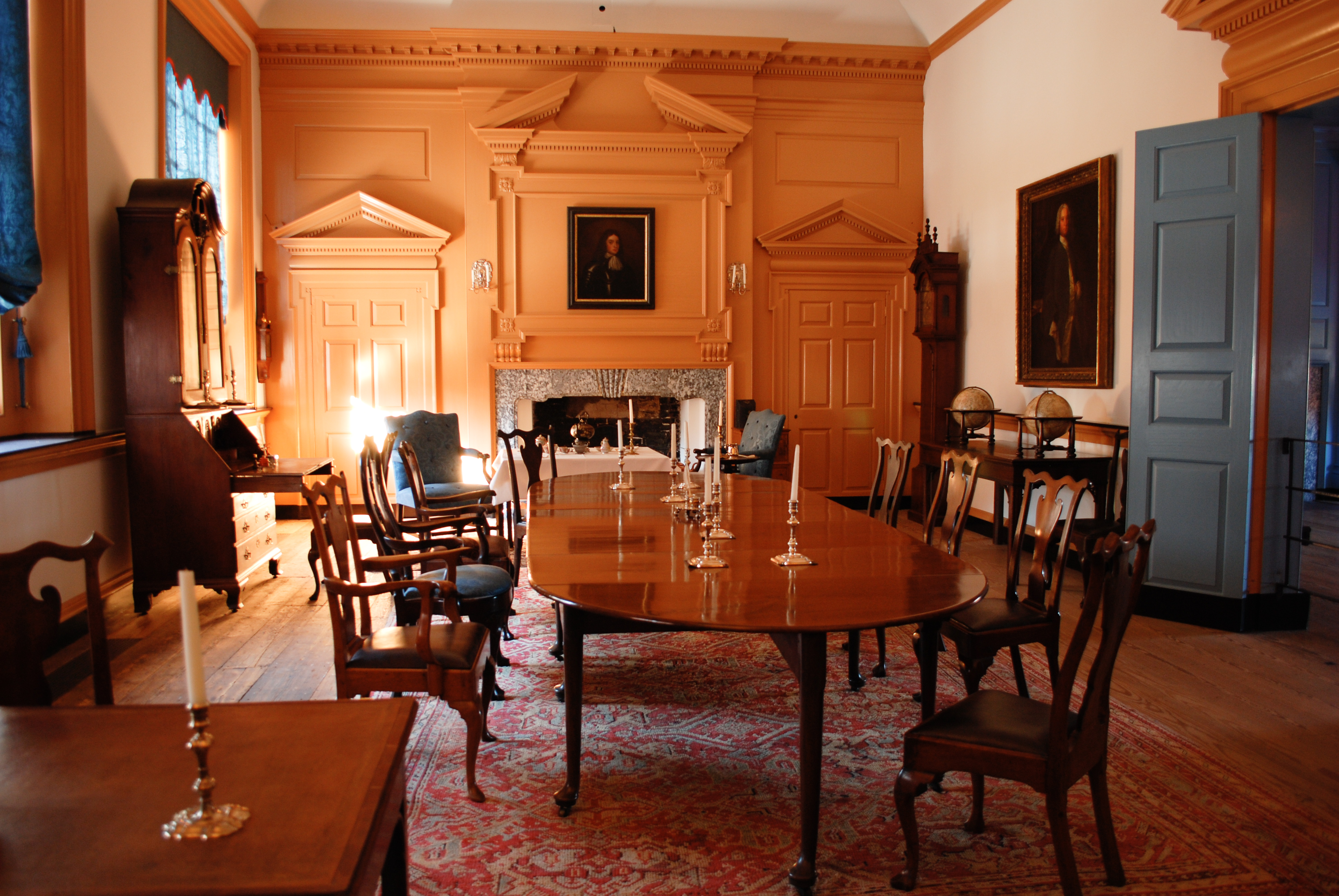
The Governor's Council Chamber

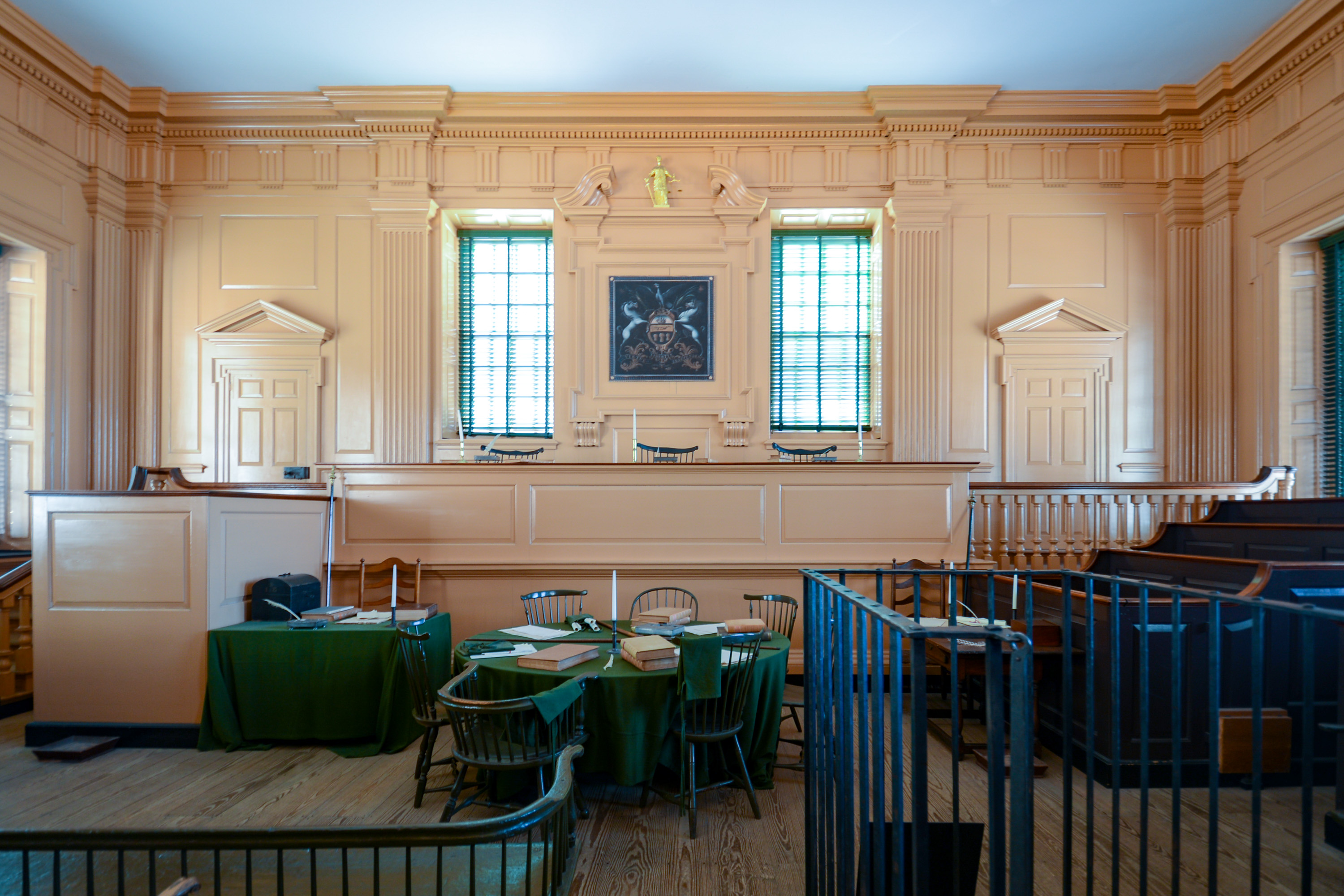
The Supreme Court Room

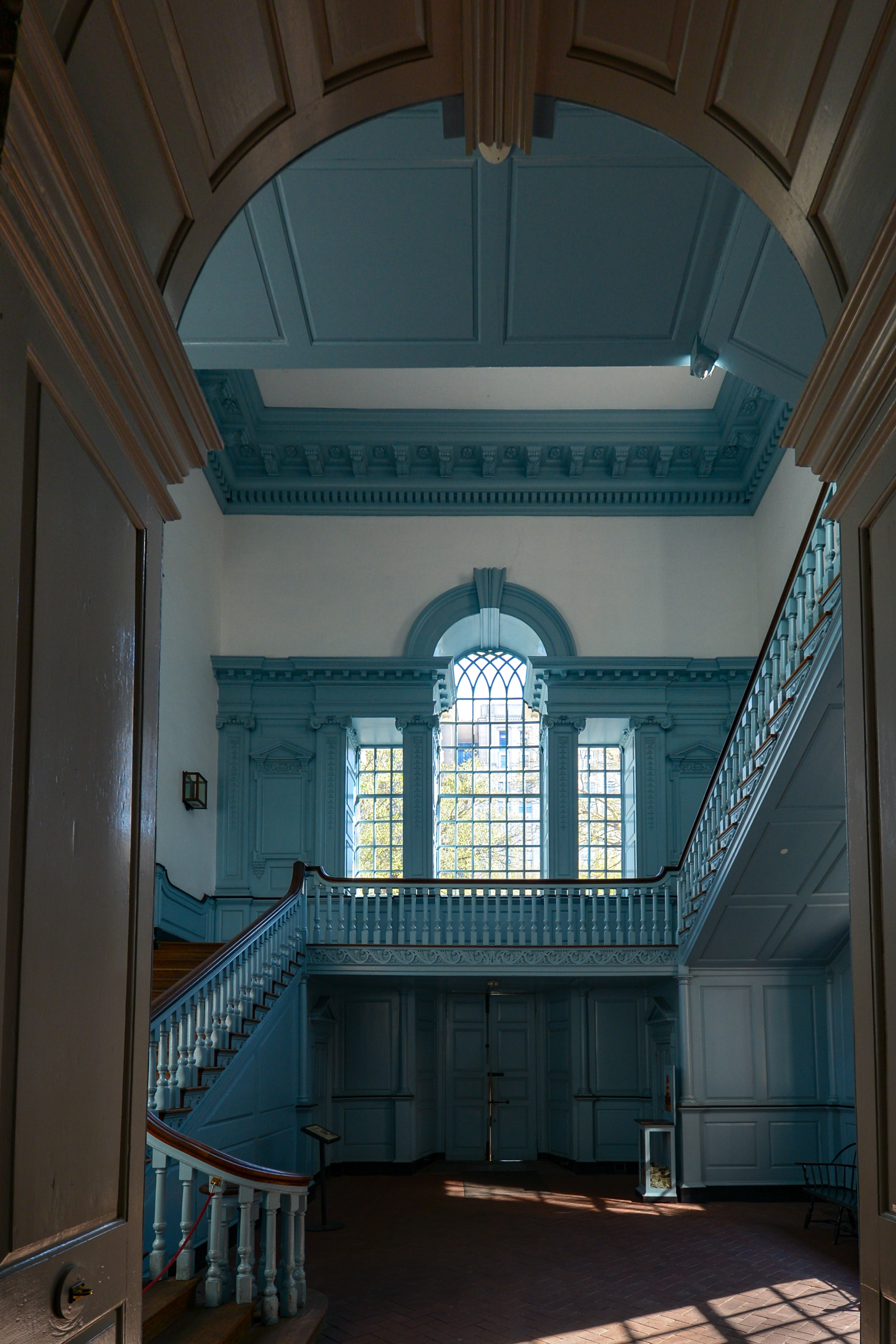
Tower Stair Hall

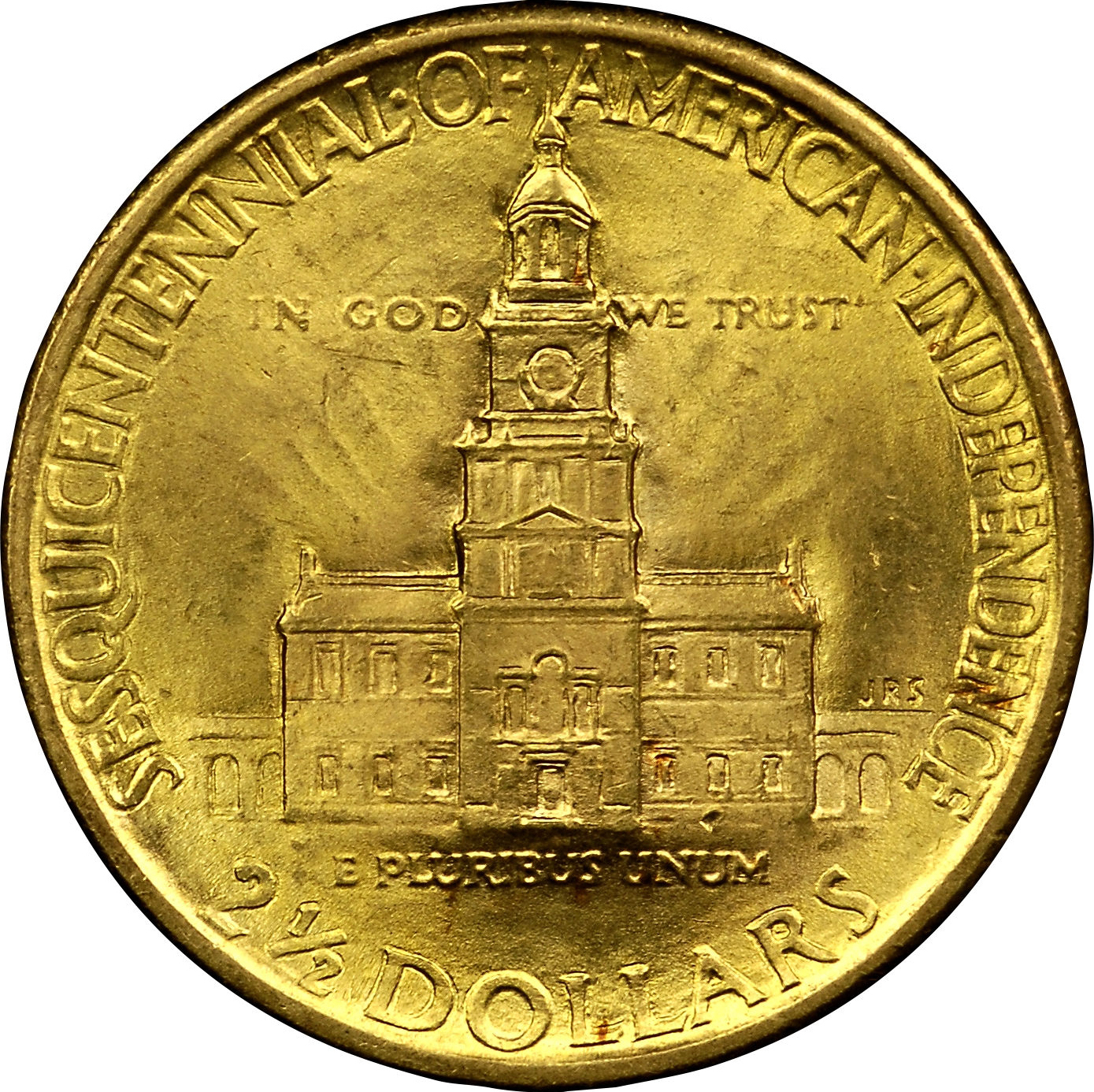
The reverse of the 1926 United States Sesquicentennial quarter-eagle features Independence Hall

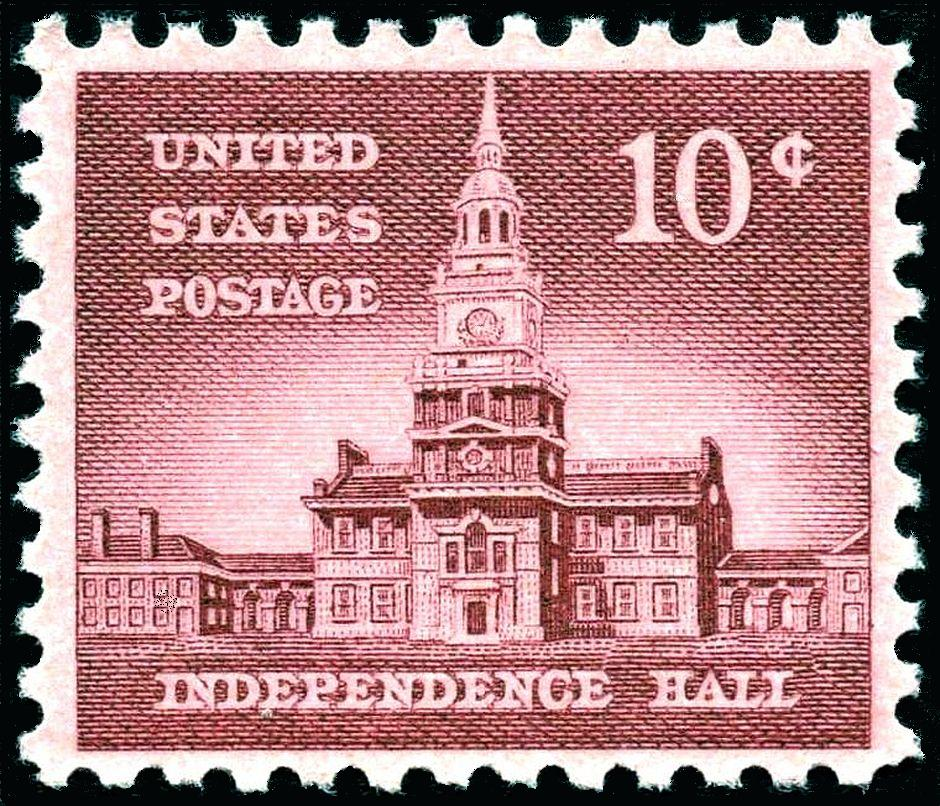
A 1956 stamp issued by the U.S. Postal Service

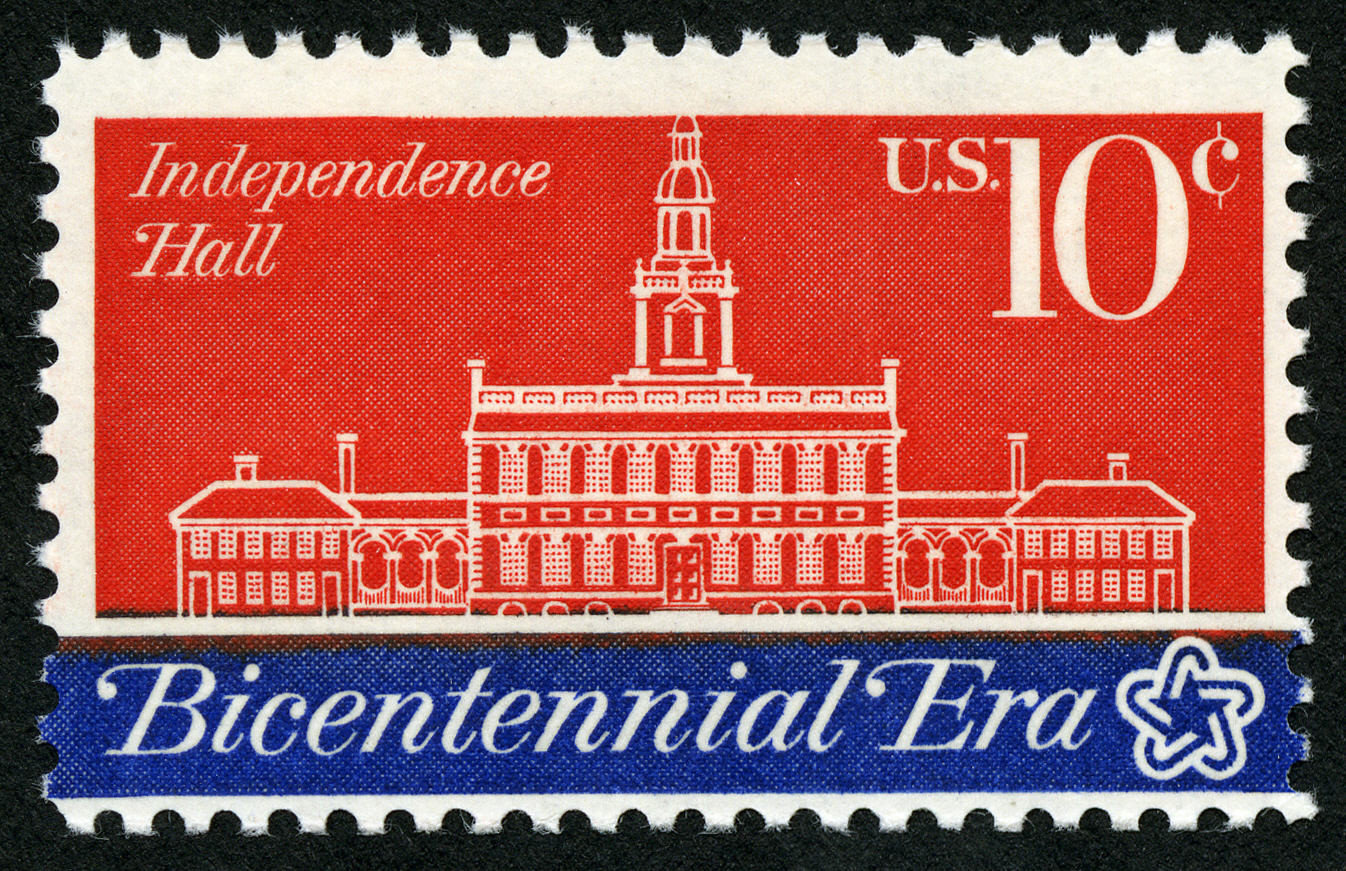
A 1974 stamp issued by the U.S. Postal Service

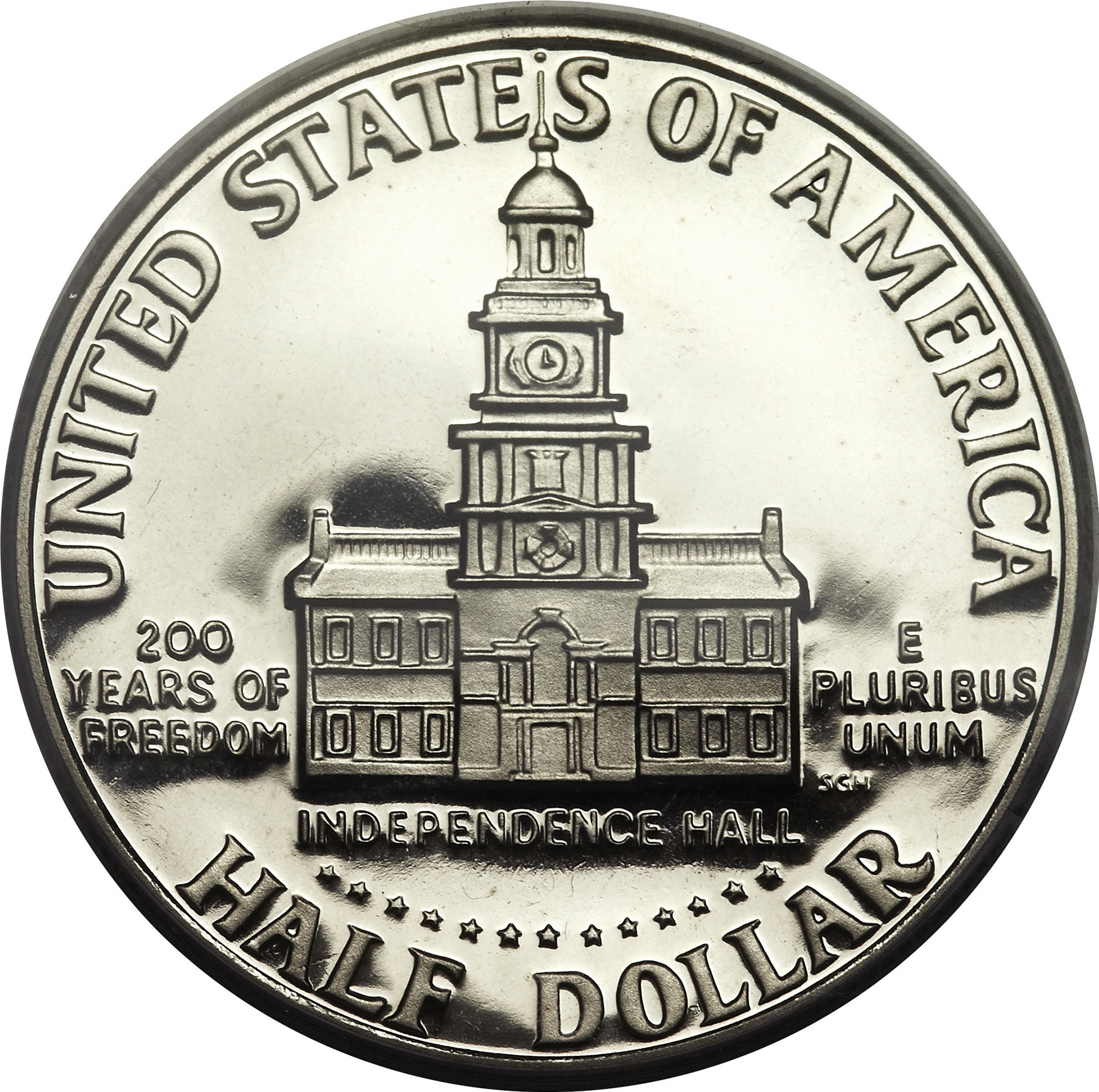
The reverse side of a Kennedy half dollar, featuring Independence Hall and issued in 1975 and 1976 to commemorate John F. Kennedy, the 35th U.S. president who was assassinated in 1963

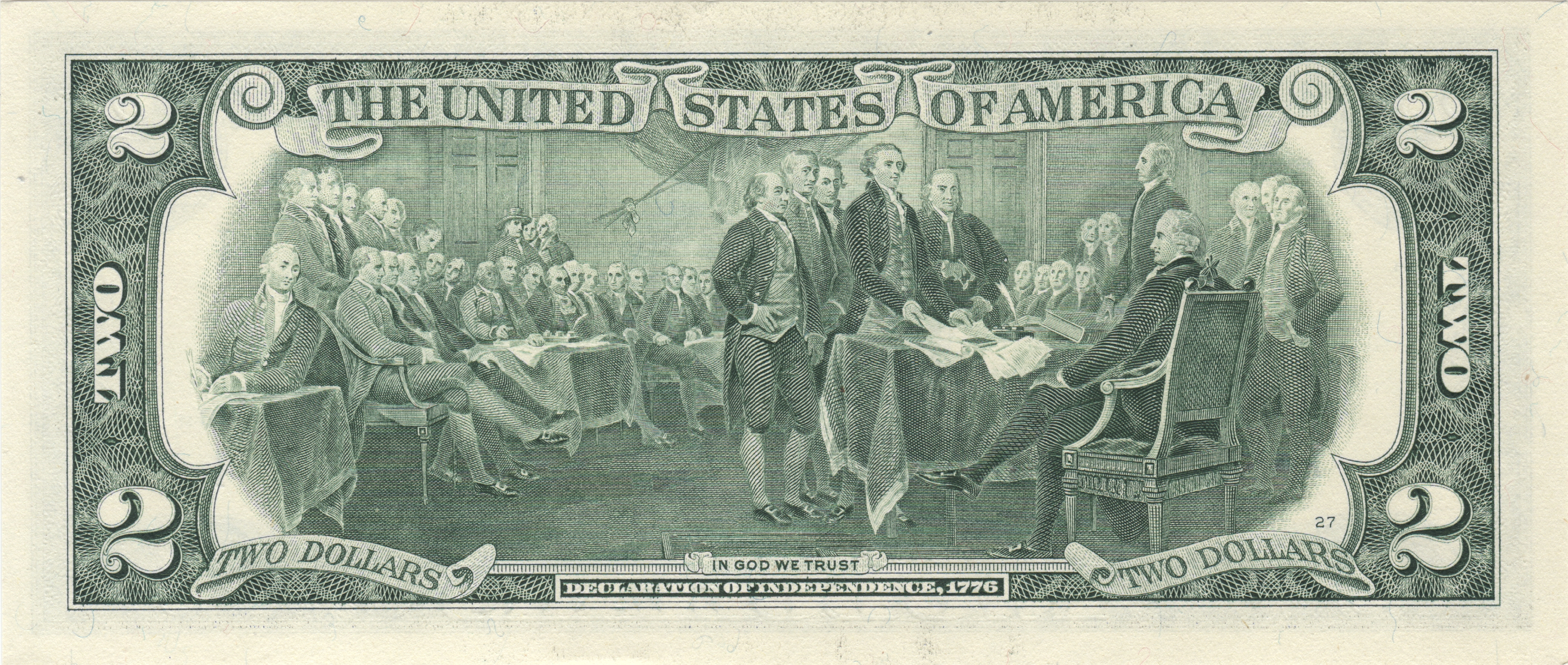
A U.S. $2 bill, issued in 2003, featuring the Committee of Five presenting its draft of the Declaration of Independence to the Second Continental Congress

== See also ==
- Battle for the Soul of the Nation speech – 2022 speech by US President Joe Biden
- Old City Hall – Meeting place of the Supreme Court
- Scene at the Signing of the Constitution of the United States – 1940 Howard Chandler Christy painting
- Syng inkstand – The inkstand used at both the signing of the Declaration of Independence and the U.S. Constitution

== Notes ==
Records
Unknown	Tallest building in Pennsylvania; 41 metres (135 ft); 1748–1754	Succeeded by Christ Church
Unknown	Tallest building in Philadelphia; 41 metres (135 ft); 1748–1754	Succeeded by Christ Church
