= NPG =

NPG may refer to:

== Music ==
- The New Power Generation, the former backing group of the musician Prince
- NPG Records, a record label of the musician Prince
- NPG Music Club, a website of the musician Prince

== Organisations ==
- National Portrait Gallery (disambiguation), several galleries
- Nature Publishing Group, a publisher based in London
- Negative Population Growth, an organization in the United States
- Nederlands Padvindsters Gilde (trans. Dutch Girl-pathfinders Guild), an organisation that became Scouting Nederland
- News-Press & Gazette Company, a United States media group
- Northern Powergrid, electrical Distribution Network Operator in the United Kingdom

== Science and technology ==
- Neopentyl glycol
- Non Processor (DMA) Grant, part of the early computer bus Unibus
- Network participating group, a functional group of Link 16 participants

== Other ==
- Nevada Proving Grounds, a former name of the Nevada National Security Site

== See also ==
- PNG (disambiguation)
