= National Portrait Gallery =

National Portrait Gallery may refer to:

- National Portrait Gallery (Australia), in Canberra
- National Portrait Gallery (Sweden), in Mariefred
- National Portrait Gallery (United States), in Washington, D.C.
- National Portrait Gallery, London, with satellite galleries in North Yorkshire and Somerset, England
- Scottish National Portrait Gallery, in Edinburgh

== See also ==
- Portrait Gallery
- NPG (disambiguation)
