= Portrait Gallery =

A Portrait Gallery is a gallery or museum in which portraits are shown.

This can be a private gallery; however, the most prominent portrait galleries are National Portrait Galleries such as:

- National Portrait Gallery (Australia) in Canberra
- National Portrait Gallery (United States) in Washington DC
- National Portrait Gallery, London, with satellite galleries in Denbighshire, Derbyshire and Somerset, England
- New Zealand Portrait Gallery Te Pūkenga Whakaata in Wellington
- Portrait Gallery of Canada in Ottawa, Ontario
- Scottish National Portrait Gallery in Edinburgh

Portrait Gallery may also refer to:

- Portrait Gallery (album), a 1975 Harry Chapin album

== See also ==
- Art gallery
- Museum
