= Glenolden, Pennsylvania =

Borough in Pennsylvania, United States

- Borough
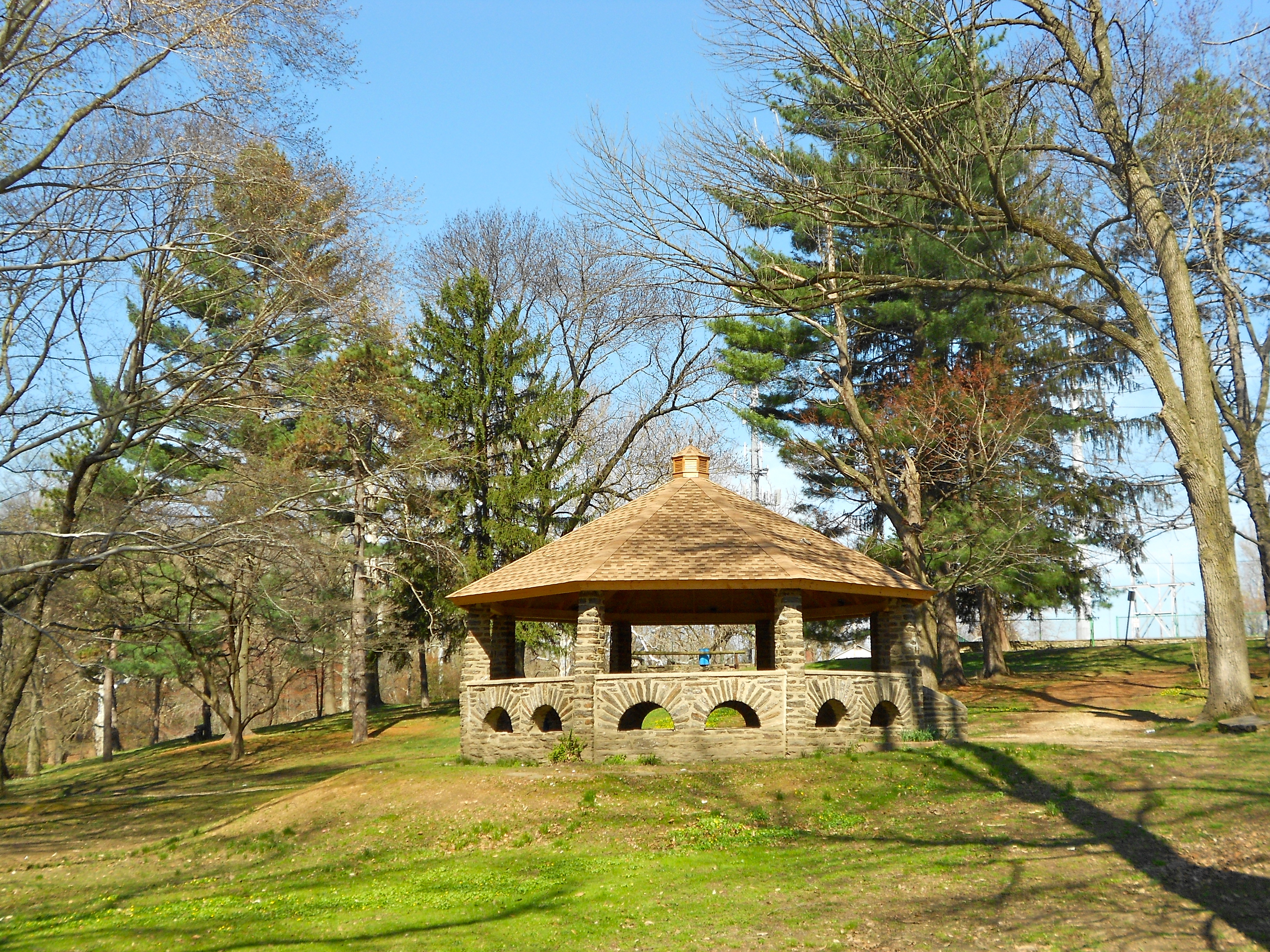
- Gazebo in Glenolden Park

- Location in Delaware County and the U.S. state of Pennsylvania.

- Location of Glenolden in Pennsylvania Glenolden (the United States)
- Coordinates: 39°53′56″N 75°17′33″W
- Country: United States
- State: Pennsylvania
- County: Delaware
- Seat: Glenolden Borough Hall - 36 Boon Avenue, Glenolden PA 19036

Government
  - Type: Mayor/Council
  - Body: Borough council

Area
  - Total: 0.97 sq mi (2.52 km^{2})
  - Land: 0.97 sq mi (2.52 km^{2})
  - Water: 0 sq mi (0.00 km^{2})
- Elevation: 92 ft (28 m)

Population (2020)
  - Total: 7,223
  - Density: 7,410.2/sq mi (2,861.11/km^{2})
- Time zone: UTC-5 (EST)
  - Summer (DST): UTC-4 (EDT)
- ZIP code: 19036
- Area codes: 610 and 484
- FIPS code: 42-29720
- Website: www.glenoldenborough.com

Glenolden is a borough in Delaware County, Pennsylvania, United States. The population was 7,223 at the 2020 census, up from 7,153 at the 2010 census.

== Geography ==
Glenolden is located at 39°53′56″N 75°17′33″W (39.898812, −75.292456). It is bordered to east and southeast by the borough of Folcroft, to the southwest by Norwood, to the northwest by Ridley Township, to the north by Darby Township, and to the northeast by Collingdale.

According to the United States Census Bureau, Glenolden has a total area of 0.97 square miles (2.52 km^{2}), all land.

== Transportation ==
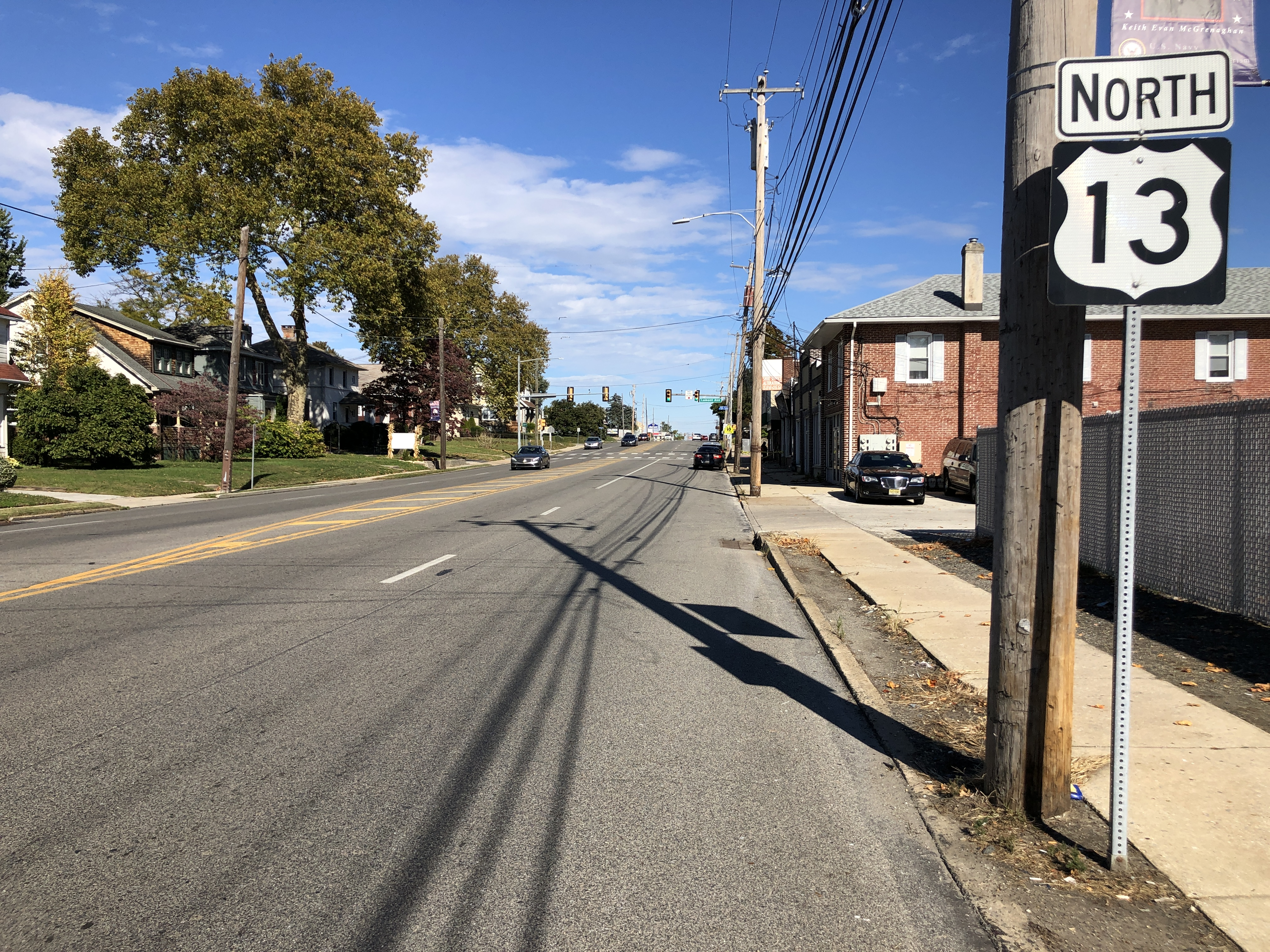
US 13 northbound in Glenolden

As of 2017, there were 17.35 miles (27.92 km) of public roads in Glenolden, of which 3.54 miles (5.70 km) were maintained by the Pennsylvania Department of Transportation (PennDOT) and 13.81 miles (22.23 km) were maintained by the borough.

The main road through the borough is Chester Pike (U.S. Route 13), which leads northeast 9 miles (14 km) to the center of Philadelphia and 5 miles (8 km) southwest to Chester.

Glenolden Station is a SEPTA train station on the Wilmington/Newark Line.

== Demographics ==
Historical population
Census	Pop.	Note	%±
1900	873		—
1910	1,157		32.5%
1920	1,944		68.0%
1930	4,482		130.6%
1940	4,825		7.7%
1950	6,450		33.7%
1960	7,249		12.4%
1970	8,697		20.0%
1980	7,633		−12.2%
1990	7,260		−4.9%
2000	7,476		3.0%
2010	7,153		−4.3%
2020	7,223		1.0%

As of Census 2010, the racial makeup of the borough was 86.9% White, 8.5% African American, 0.1% Native American, 1.7% Asian, 0.1% Native Hawaiian and Other Pacific Islander, 0.3% from other races, and 2.4% from two or more races. Hispanic or Latino of any race were 2.2% of the population .

As of the census of 2000, there were 7,476 people, 3,058 households, and 1,871 families residing in the borough. The population density was 7,673.6 inhabitants per square mile (2,962.8/km^{2}). There were 3,198 housing units at an average density of 3,282.5 per square mile (1,267.4/km^{2}). The racial makeup of the borough was 92.28% White, 4.03% African American, 0.04% Native American, 2.38% Asian, 0.01% Pacific Islander, 0.21% from other races, and 1.04% from two or more races. Hispanic or Latino of any race were 1.18% of the population.

There were 3,058 households, out of which 28.3% had children under the age of 18 living with them, 44.1% were married couples living together, 12.9% had a female householder with no husband present, and 38.8% were non-families. 33.1% of all households were made up of individuals, and 11.5% had someone living alone who was 65 years of age or older. The average household size was 2.43 and the average family size was 3.17.

In the borough the population was spread out, with 23.8% under the age of 18, 9.1% from 18 to 24, 31.8% from 25 to 44, 20.6% from 45 to 64, and 14.8% who were 65 years of age or older. The median age was 36 years. For every 100 females there were 90.4 males. For every 100 females age 18 and over, there were 88.3 males.

The median income for a household in the borough was $41,189, and the median income for a family was $48,648. Males had a median income of $39,401 versus $29,083 for females. The per capita income for the borough was $20,173. About 3.4% of families and 5.0% of the population were below the poverty line, including 4.6% of those under age 18 and 5.5% of those age 65 or over.

== Education ==
Students living in Glenolden attend classes in the Interboro School District, which consists of Glenolden and its neighboring towns Prospect Park, Norwood, and Tinicum Township. Glenolden School is the home of the borough's public elementary and middle schools. Public school students attend Interboro High School in Prospect Park.

The school district's administration offices are located in Prospect Park.

== Notable people ==
- Theresa Grentz, former Illinois women's basketball head coach and Women's Basketball Hall of Fame inductee
- Jack McFetridge (1869–1917), Major League Baseball pitcher
- Mildred Scott Olmsted (1890–1990), peace activist
- Vince Papale, former member of the Philadelphia Eagles and subject of the movie Invincible, born in Glenolden
