= Pennsylvania Route 291 =

State highway in Pennsylvania, US

Pennsylvania Route 291

Route information
- Maintained by PennDOT
- Length: 15.965 mi (25.693 km)
- Existed: 1928–present

Major junctions
- West end: US 13 / US 13 Bus. in Trainer
- US 322 in Chester; PA 320 in Chester; US 13 in Chester; PA 420 in Tinicum Township; I-95 in Philadelphia; I-76 in Philadelphia
- East end: PA 611 in Philadelphia

Location
- Country: United States
- State: Pennsylvania
- Counties: Delaware, Philadelphia

Highway system
- Pennsylvania State Route System; Interstate; US; State; Scenic; Legislative
← PA 290	→ PA 292

Pennsylvania Route 291 (PA 291) is an east–west state route in Pennsylvania that runs from U.S. Route 13 (US 13) and US 13 Business (US 13 Bus.) in Trainer, Delaware County, east to Pennsylvania Route 611 in South Philadelphia near the Walt Whitman Bridge and the South Philadelphia Sports Complex. Except for a short 1-mile (1.6 km) section between the western terminus and the Chester/Trainer line, and the section past the junction with Interstate 76 (I-76), PA 291 is mostly a four-lane highway. From the western terminus to the eastern part of Chester, the route has a concurrency with US 13. It runs parallel to the Delaware River for much of the route. The route passes through industrial areas near the river in Delaware County, serving Chester, Eddystone, Essington, and Lester. PA 291 enters Philadelphia near the Philadelphia International Airport, at which point it has an interchange with I-95. The route crosses the Schuylkill River on the George C. Platt Memorial Bridge and continues along Penrose Avenue to I-76, before officially ending at PA 611 at Broad Street. It has been designated the Industrial Heritage Highway.

PA 291 was first designated by 1928 along an unpaved road from PA 420 in Prospect Park east to PA 191. The route was extended west to US 13 in Eddystone by 1930 on a paved road. PA 291 was realigned to run from US 13 in Trainer to PA 420 in Essington by 1940. The route was extended to PA 191 in Philadelphia by 1950, following Industrial Highway. PA 291 was extended to US 611 (now PA 611) at Philadelphia City Hall in Center City Philadelphia along Penrose Avenue, Moyamensing Avenue, and Broad Street. A freeway was proposed along the PA 291 corridor between I-95 and I-76 from 1950 until the 1970s, when it was cancelled due to funding issues. The eastern terminus was moved to its current location by 1989, with an extended PA 611 replacing PA 291 on Broad Street. Around 2000, the route was rebuilt as a five-lane road in Chester. PA 291 was realigned further to the northwest to bypass the Philadelphia International Airport in 2006.

== Route description ==
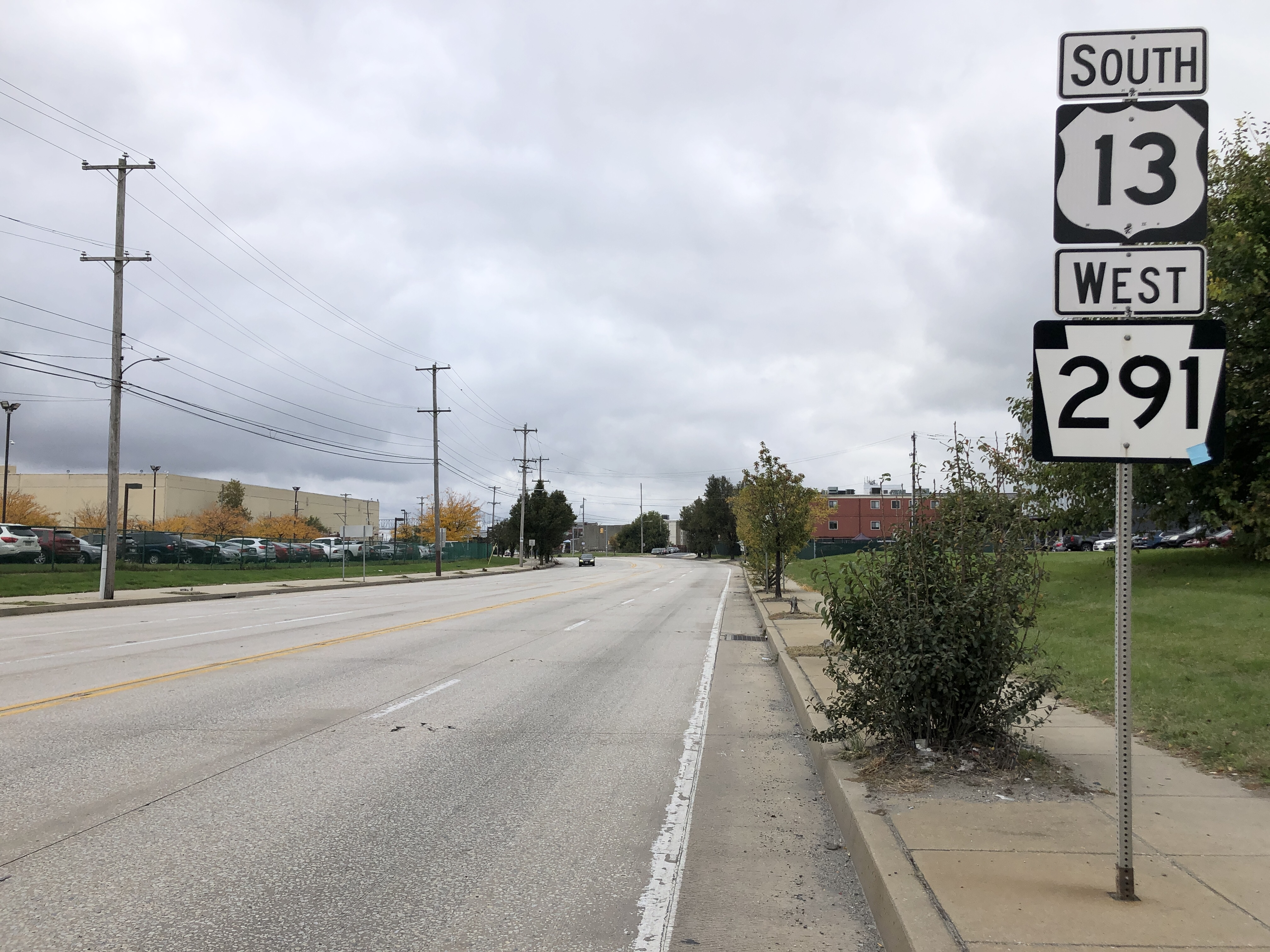
US 13 southbound/PA 291 westbound in Chester

PA 291 begins at an intersection with US 13 and the southern terminus of US 13 Bus. near Delta Air Lines' Trainer Refinery in the borough of Trainer in Delaware County, heading southeast on two-lane undivided Price Street concurrent with US 13. The road passes between homes to the northeast and industrial areas to the southwest. The two routes make a sharp curve to the northeast and become West 2nd Street, crossing into the city of Chester and running through urban residential and industrial areas. US 13/PA 291 continues northeast and becomes a five-lane road with a center left-turn lane as it passes more urban development and empty lots. The two routes come to ramps that provide access from the eastbound direction of US 322 and to the westbound direction of US 322 just northwest of where that route crosses the Delaware River on the Commodore Barry Bridge. The road passes under the western approach of the Commodore Barry Bridge carrying US 322.

Following this, US 13/PA 291 passes more urban homes and businesses as it heads northwest of the Chester Waterfront along the Delaware River. The two routes split from West 2nd Street and continue northeast as an unnamed road, crossing Chester Creek before passing south of Chester's City Hall and north of the William Penn Landing Site. US 13/PA 291 intersects the southern terminus of PA 320 (Madison Street northbound and Upland Street southbound), at which point the road becomes East 4th Street. The road continues through commercial areas and US 13 splits from PA 291 by turning north onto Morton Avenue. At this point, PA 291 runs between Amtrak's Northeast Corridor railroad line to the northwest and State Correctional Institution – Chester to the southeast before intersecting Harrah's Boulevard, which provides access to Harrah's Philadelphia casino and harness racetrack to the southeast along the Delaware River. The road continues northeast between the Amtrak line to the northwest and Conrail Shared Assets Operations' (CSAO) Chester Industrial Track line to the southeast, crossing the Ridley Creek out of Chester and into the borough of Eddystone.

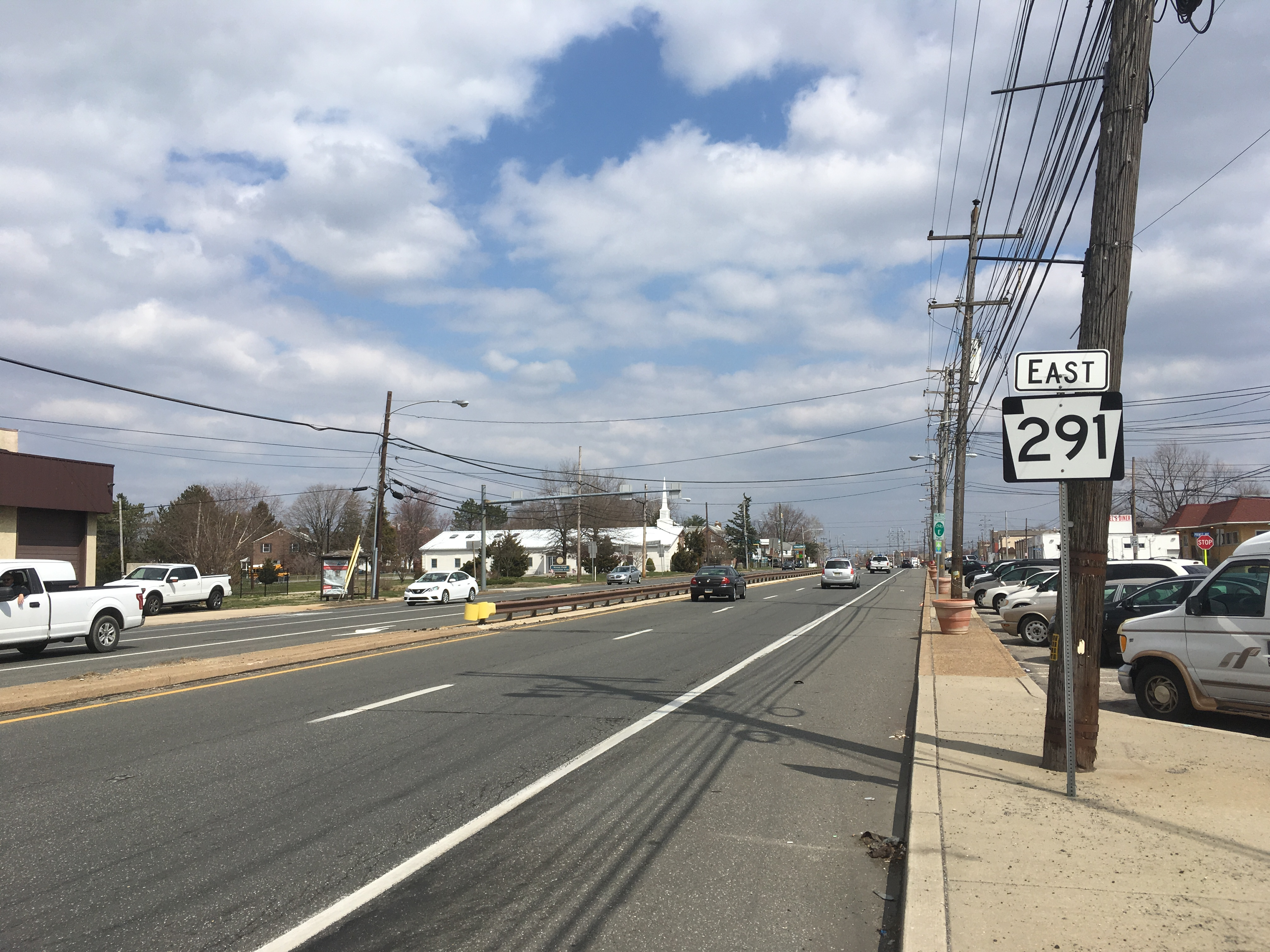
PA 291 eastbound past PA 420 in Essington

Here, PA 291 becomes Industrial Highway, a four-lane divided highway, and continues east, with the Northeast Corridor line heading northeast away from the highway. The road runs through industrial areas, passing to the north of Constellation Energy's Eddystone Generating Station. The route crosses the Crum Creek into Ridley Township and passes through Boeing Defense, Space & Security's Vertical Lift helicopter plant. In this area, PA 291 intersects Stewart Avenue, which heads northwest to an interchange with I-95. Past this, the Chester Industrial Track heads farther south from the road as it passes more commercial establishments. The route crosses the Darby Creek into Tinicum Township and runs east past businesses and private airport parking lots, intersecting the southern terminus of PA 420 at Wanamaker Avenue to the north of the community of Essington.

Past this intersection, PA 291 continues east through commercial areas with some homes, becoming Governor Printz Boulevard. The route heads northeast into the community of Lester, where it passes north of a private airport parking lot and splits into the one-way pair of South Governor Printz Boulevard eastbound and North Governor Printz Boulevard westbound, carrying two lanes in each direction and passing more development. The two directions rejoin as a four-lane divided highway with a wide median that runs near commercial establishments, heading to the south of an office park and coming to a ramp from northbound I-95 to eastbound PA 291 that merges in from the left. From here, the route continues east as four-lane divided Industrial Highway between I-95 to the north and a lake to the south, coming to a bridge over CSAO's Chester Secondary railroad line. At this point, PA 291 reaches the Philadelphia International Airport, where it turns north onto four-lane divided Bartram Avenue and crosses under I-95 while Industrial Highway continues east to the airport passenger terminals and Scott Way continues south to private airport parking lots and the airport cargo terminals.

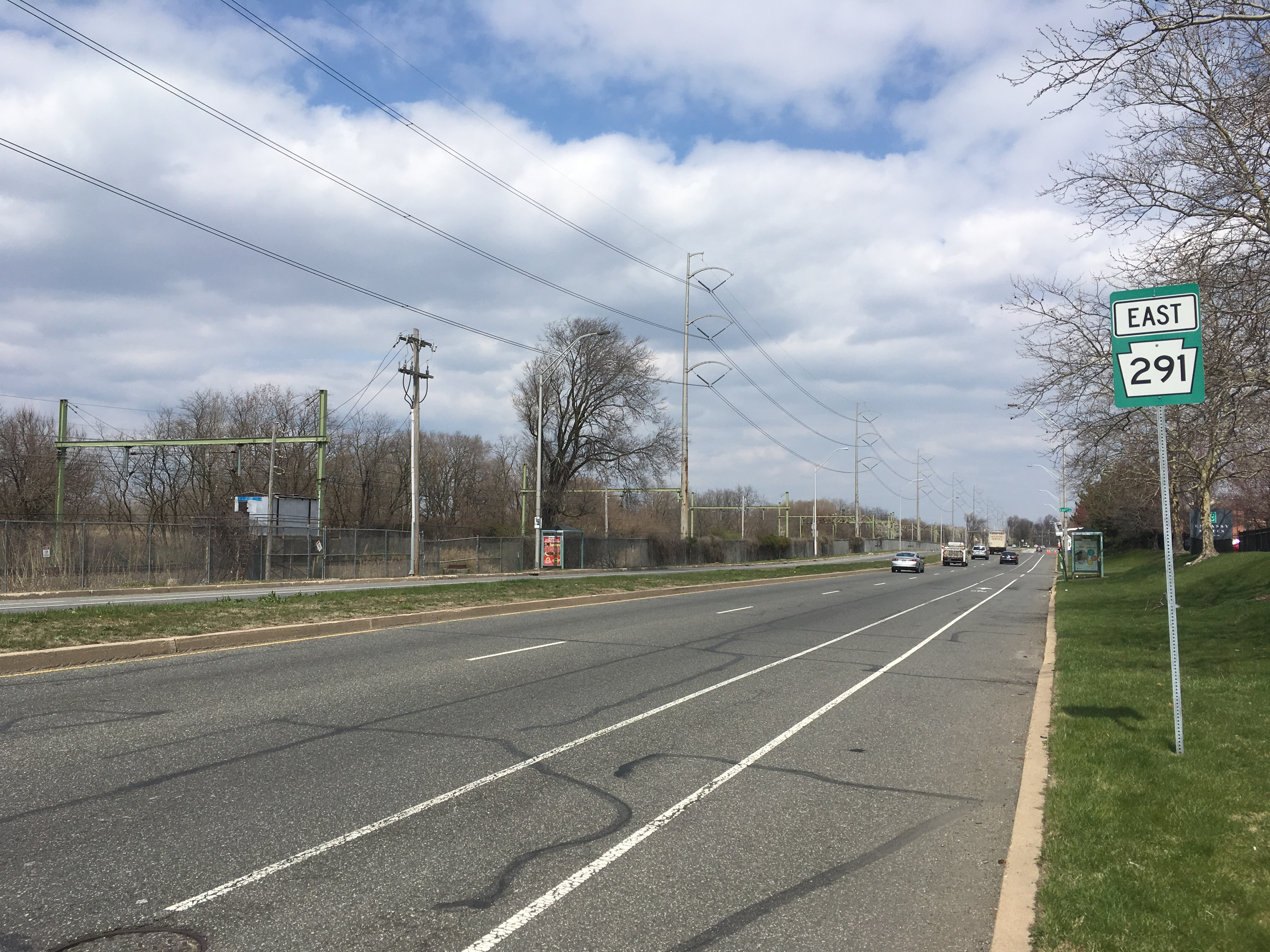
PA 291 eastbound along Bartram Avenue near the Philadelphia International Airport in Philadelphia

After crossing under I-95, PA 291 enters the city of Philadelphia in Philadelphia County and curves to the northeast, running parallel to the Chester Secondary to the northwest, with the John Heinz National Wildlife Refuge at Tinicum located on the other side of the railroad tracks. The road passes under SEPTA's Airport Line leading to the airport, at which point that railroad line comes to a junction with the Chester Secondary. The route continues northeast parallel to the Airport Line, reaching a partial interchange with I-95 that has ramps to and from the southbound lanes of I-95. Within this interchange, a park and ride lot is located southeast of the road. PA 291 passes to the northwest of a business park and hotels before it curves away from the railroad tracks near the Eastwick station on the Airport Line and heads to the north of the airport's Employee Parking Lot, intersecting 84th Street. The route turns south onto four-lane divided Island Avenue and passes under I-95 again, with a ramp to southbound I-95. On the edge of the Philadelphia International Airport property, to the east of the airport's Economy Parking Lot, PA 291 turns east onto six-lane divided Penrose Avenue and passes more businesses, curving northeast and coming to a partial interchange with I-95 that has a ramp from northbound I-95 to PA 291 and a ramp from southbound PA 291 to southbound I-95. Past this interchange, the route becomes four lanes and ascends onto the George C. Platt Memorial Bridge, a through truss bridge, passing near industrial areas before heading over CSAO's 60th Street Industrial Track line and crossing over the Schuylkill River.

After crossing the river, the bridge passes over part of the large former Philadelphia Energy Solutions oil refinery. After descending off the bridge, the route continues as four-lane divided Penrose Avenue near some businesses. PA 291 has a junction with 26th Street, which heads north to provide access to westbound I-76 (Schuylkill Expressway) and from eastbound I-76, and an entrance road that heads south to The Navy Yard, a mixed-use development that is located at the former Philadelphia Naval Shipyard. Past this intersection, the road passes under a CSAO railroad spur and CSX's Harrisburg Subdivision railroad line before intersecting Pattison Avenue, which heads east to the South Philadelphia Sports Complex, and becoming a five-lane road with a center left-turn lane, running past homes and businesses in South Philadelphia. PA 291 reaches its signed eastern terminus at a partial interchange with I-76, with access to eastbound I-76 and from westbound I-76. Past this, the road continues northeast as Moyamensing Avenue before turning onto Oregon Avenue and reaching its eastern terminus at PA 611. Some official maps show the designation continuing up to City Hall.

== History ==
When Pennsylvania first legislated routes in 1911, what would become PA 291 was not legislated as part of any route. PA 291 was first designated by 1928 to run from PA 420 in Prospect Park east to PA 191 along an unpaved road. By 1930, PA 291 was extended west to US 13 in Eddystone, following PA 420 south for a short concurrency before continuing west along its current alignment. The extended alignment of PA 291 was a paved road. By 1940, PA 291 was realigned to run from US 13 in Trainer east to PA 420 near Essington. The former alignment east of PA 420 became an unnumbered road.

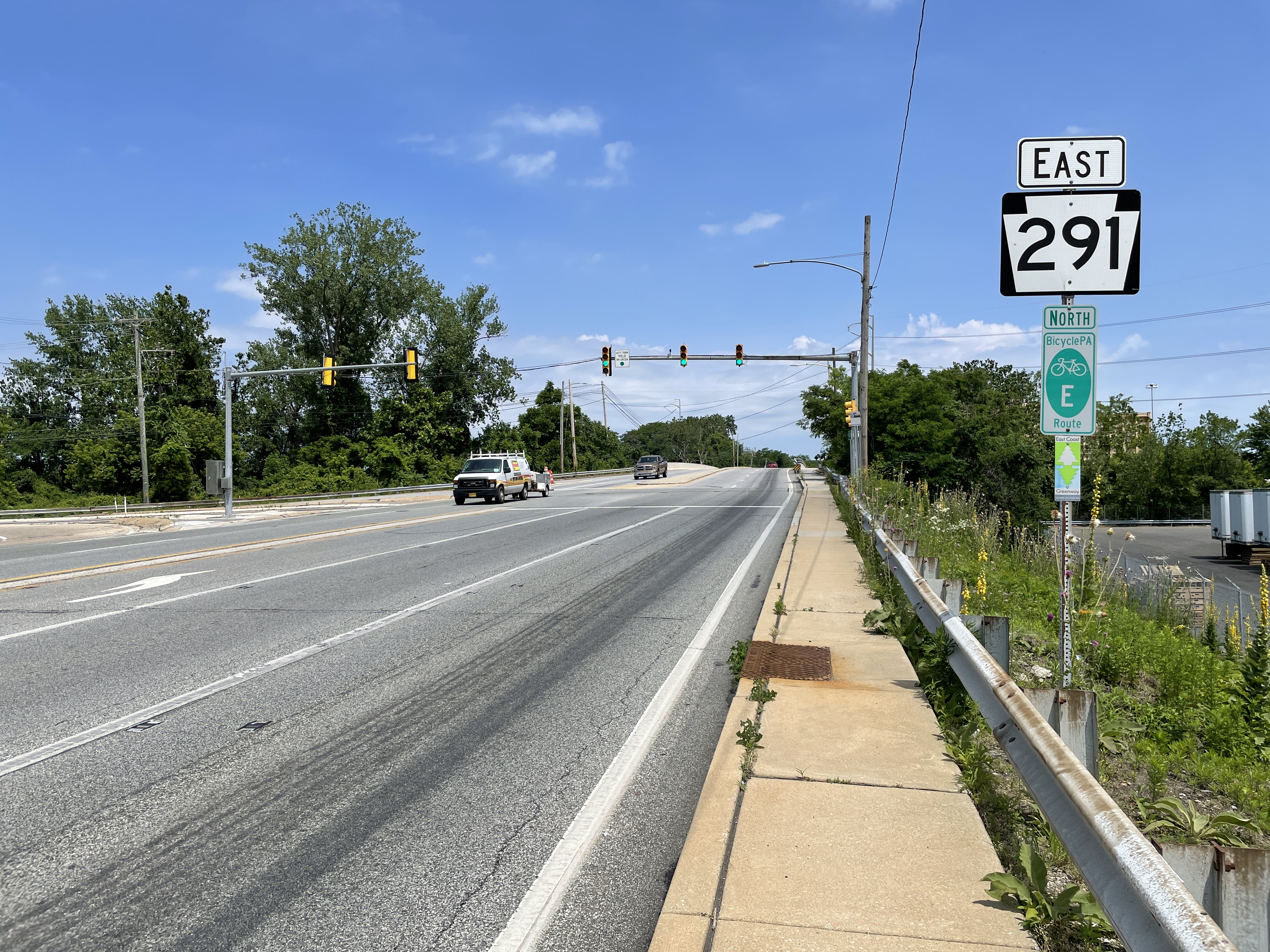
PA 291 eastbound in Ridley Township

PA 291 was extended northeast to PA 191 (80th Street) in Philadelphia by 1950, following the newly-built Industrial Highway in Tinicum Township before heading along Essington Avenue. In the 1950s, PA 291 was extended northeast to US 611 at Philadelphia City Hall in Center City Philadelphia, following Penrose Avenue, Moyamensing Avenue, and Broad Street to Center City Philadelphia. This section replaced the PA 191 designation along Penrose Avenue, Moyamensing Avenue, and Broad Street. In the 1970s, the Airport Circle was removed.

In 1950, the Philadelphia City Planning Commission proposed a PA 291 freeway along Penrose Avenue between the Delaware Expressway (I-95) near the Philadelphia International Airport and the Schuylkill Expressway (I-76) in South Philadelphia. The freeway was to split into two alignments leading to I-76: one following South 26th Street to connect to westbound I-76 and the other following Penrose Avenue to connect to eastbound I-76. Plans for the PA 291 freeway were dropped in the 1970s because the Pennsylvania Department of Transportation halted a number of road projects due to funding issues.

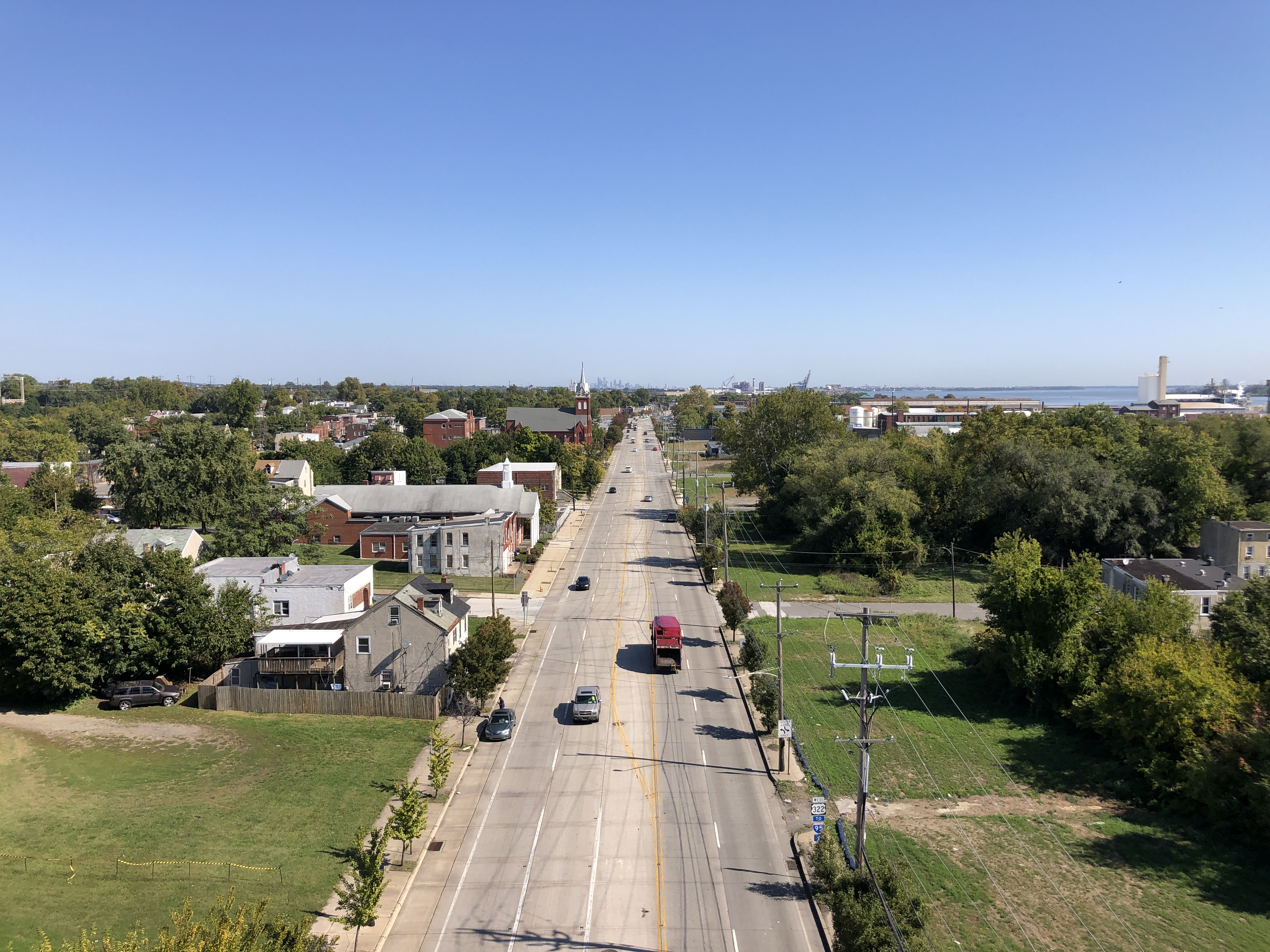
US 13 northbound/PA 291 eastbound in Chester

The eastern terminus of PA 291 was cut back from PA 3 and PA 611 at Philadelphia City Hall to I-76 by 1989. The former portion of PA 291 along Broad Street was replaced by an extended PA 611. In 1999, PA 291 was realigned in Chester to a new five-lane alignment that connected 2nd Street and 4th Street to improve travel for trucks and attempt to revitalize Chester. Construction of the new alignment took two years. Before this, PA 291 continued east along 2nd Street and turned north on Crosby Street to reach 4th Street. Expansion of the road to five lanes through the remainder of Chester was slated to be complete in 2001. In 2005, a bill was introduced into the Pennsylvania General Assembly designating the portion of PA 291 through Chester as the Rosa Parks Memorial Highway in honor of civil rights activist Rosa Parks; this bill was signed into law by Governor Ed Rendell on October 27, 2006.

In 2006, PA 291 was rerouted to use Bartram Avenue and Island Avenue around the Philadelphia International Airport instead of Industrial Highway due to runway expansion at the airport. In May 2011, a $42 million project began to rehabilitate the George C. Platt Memorial Bridge. The project was completed in June 2014. In 2022, US 13 was realigned to run concurrent with PA 291 between the western terminus in Trainer and Morton Avenue in Chester.

== Major intersections ==
County	Location	mi	km	Destinations	Notes
Delaware	Trainer	0.000	0.000	US 13 south / US 13 Bus. north (Post Road) – Marcus Hook, Chester	Western terminus; western end of US 13 concurrency; southern terminus of US 13 Bus.
Delaware	Chester	1.387	2.232	US 322 west to I-95 – Wilmington, Philadelphia	Interchange; access to US 322 west and from US 322 east
Delaware	Chester	2.985	4.804	PA 320 north (Madison Street)	Southern terminus of PA 320
Delaware	Chester	3.152	5.073	US 13 north (Morton Avenue)	Eastern end of US 13 concurrency
Delaware	Tinicum Township	6.206	9.988	PA 420 north (Wanamaker Avenue) to I-95 – Morton	Southern terminus of PA 420
Delaware	Tinicum Township			I-95 north	Eastbound entrance only
Philadelphia	Philadelphia	9.059	14.579	I-95 south – Chester, Wilmington	Access to and from I-95 south; exit 12B on I-95
Philadelphia	Philadelphia	10.504	16.905	I-95 south – Chester	Access to I-95 south and from I-95 north; exit 13 on I-95
Philadelphia	Philadelphia			George C. Platt Memorial Bridge over the Schuylkill River	
Philadelphia	Philadelphia	13.136	21.140	26th Street to I-76 west – Valley Forge	
Philadelphia	Philadelphia	14.014	22.553	I-76 east – Walt Whitman Bridge	Eastbound exit and westbound entrance; exit 348 on I-76
Philadelphia	Philadelphia	15.965	25.693	PA 611 (Broad Street) – Center City	Eastern terminus of PA 291
1.000 mi = 1.609 km; 1.000 km = 0.621 mi: Concurrency terminus; Incomplete access

== PA 291 Alternate Truck ==
PA Route 291 Alternate Truck
- Location: Tinicum Township-Philadelphia
- Length: 4.9 mi (7.9 km)
- Existed: 2023–present

Pennsylvania Route 291 Alternate Truck is a truck route that bypasses a weight restricted bridge on mainline PA 291 on which trucks over 31 tons and combination loads over 35 tons are prohibited. The route follows PA 420 and I-95, and it was formed in 2023.

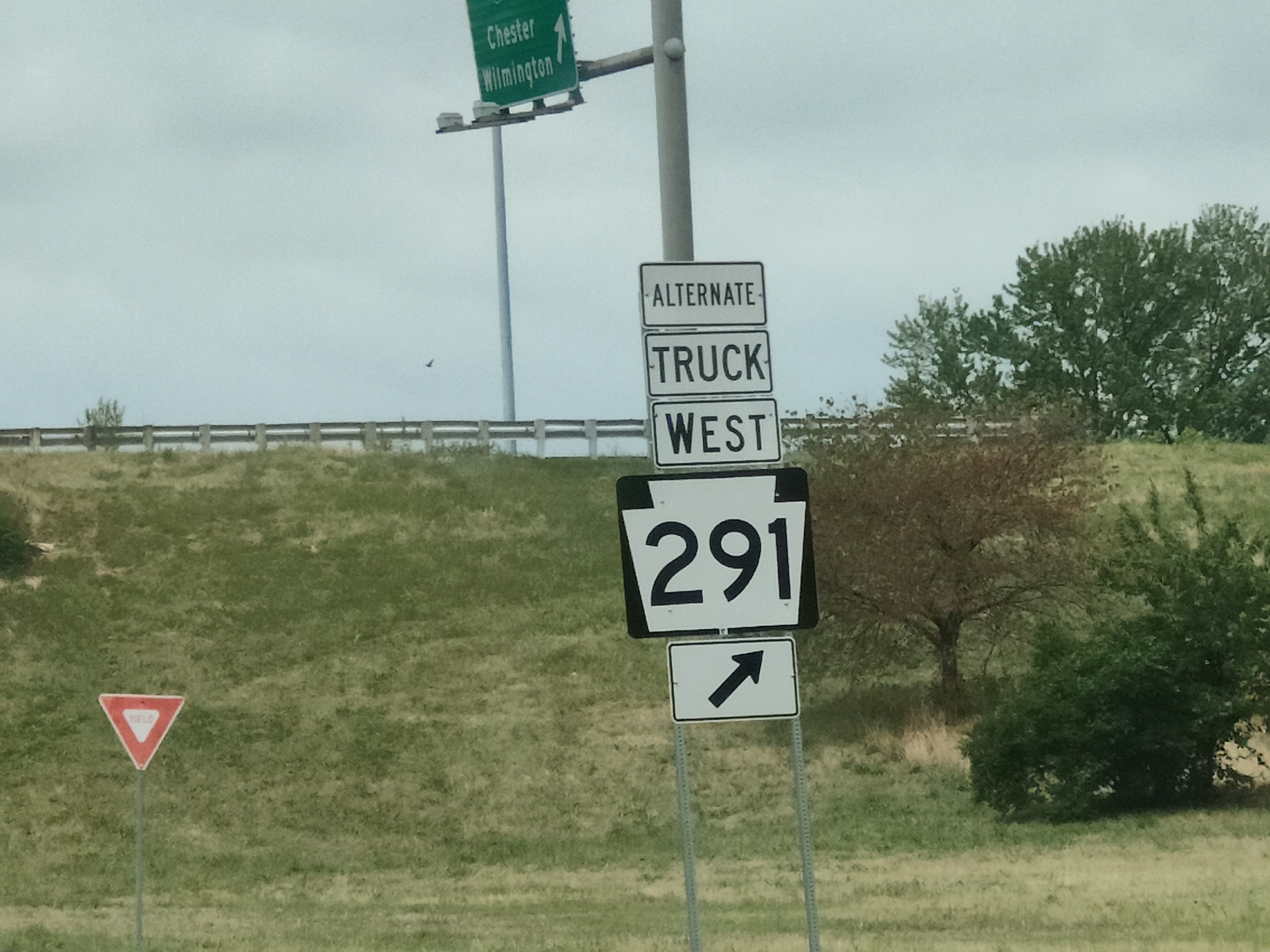
PA 291 Alternate Truck westbound exiting I-95 onto PA 420 in Tinicum Township.
