= Vince Papale =

American football player (born 1946)

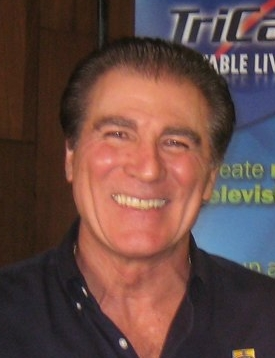
- Papale in January 2009

No. 83
- Position: Wide receiver

Personal information
- Born: February 9, 1946 (age 80); Glenolden, Pennsylvania, U.S.
- Listed height: 6 ft 2 in (1.88 m)
- Listed weight: 195 lb (88 kg)

Career information
- High school: Interboro (Prospect Park, Pennsylvania)
- College: Saint Joseph's (PA)
- NFL draft: 1969: undrafted

Career history
- Philadelphia Bell (1974–1975); Philadelphia Eagles (1976–1978)

Awards and highlights
- Philadelphia Eagles 75th Anniversary Team

Career NFL statistics
- Receptions: 1
- Receiving yards: 15
- Fumble recoveries: 2
- Tackles: 20
- Stats at Pro Football Reference

Vincent Francis Papale (born February 9, 1946) is an American former professional football player who was a wide receiver in the National Football League (NFL). He played three seasons with the NFL's Philadelphia Eagles, primarily on special teams, following two seasons with the Philadelphia Bell of the World Football League (WFL). Papale's story was the inspiration behind the 2006 film Invincible in which he was played by Mark Wahlberg.

== Early life and education ==
Papale was born February 9, 1946, in Glenolden, Pennsylvania. He attended Interboro High School in Prospect Park, where he lettered in football, basketball, and track and field.

In his only year of varsity football, Papale won All-Delaware County Honorable Mention honors. In track, he was a standout pole vaulter, triple jumper, and long jumper. He began competing in track during his senior year at Interboro. He won the District I (Philadelphia suburban area) large-schools championship in pole vault, then finished fourth in the Pennsylvania state meet. Papale's best pole vault that year was 12 ft 9 in (3.89 m), which edged him into the top 10 of Interboro high school vaulters.

=== College ===
Papale attended Saint Joseph's University in Philadelphia on a track scholarship (the university did not have a football team). As a junior, he won a United States Track & Field Federation (USTFF) college development pole vault at Madison Square Garden (February 10) with a vault of 14 ft 6 in (4.42 m). He never placed at IC4A or Penn Relays. Papale did score in the Middle Atlantic Conference championships. He graduated in 1968 with an MS degree in Marketing/Management Science.

=== Track and field personal bests and meet results ===
Sophomore Year (1966)
Second in Pole Vault (winner 14 ft 3 in (4.34 m))
Second in the triple jump (winner 45 ft 3 in (13.79 m))
Junior Year (1967)

Senior Year (1968)
Third in the pole vault (winner Peter Chiniese 15 feet 1 3/4 inches (4.616 m))
First in the long jump (22 feet 1 1/4 inches (6.737 m))
First in the triple jump (46 ft 6 in (14.17 m))

== Professional career ==
=== Minor League Football ===
Vince Papale's post-collegiate football career began with the Aston Green Knights of the semi-pro Seaboard Football League. At that time, Papale was a teacher at Interboro High School and was coaching the junior varsity football team when he successfully tried out for the Philadelphia Bell of the World Football League as a wide receiver. In an episode of the ESPN documentary series Lost Treasures of NFL Films concerning the WFL, Papale claimed he lied about his age to join the team (claiming to be 24 years old, when in fact he was 28 at the time.) In his first season with the Bell, Papale caught nine passes for 121 yards, averaging 13.4 yards per catch including catching the first pass in the history of the new league. In 1975 Papale caught only one pass, but it was for a forty-nine-yard touchdown. In both seasons with the team, Papale was a special teams standout.

=== Philadelphia Eagles ===
Papale's performance with the Philadelphia Bell earned him a meeting in 1976 with head coach Dick Vermeil of the Philadelphia Eagles after general manager Jim Murray got him an invitation to a private workout held by Coach Vermeil.

Papale eventually made the team, thereby becoming, at age 30, the oldest rookie non-kicker in the history of the NFL to play without the benefit of college football experience. He went on to play wide receiver and special teams for the Eagles from 1976 through 1978. During that time, he played in 41 of 44 regular season games (regular seasons being 14 games in 1976–1977 and 16 games in 1978), recording two fumble recoveries and one 15-yard reception. He was voted Special Teams Captain by his teammates and "Man of the Year" by the Eagles in 1978 for his many charitable activities. A shoulder injury ended his career in 1979. After retiring from the NFL, he worked as a TV and radio broadcaster for eight years, then became a commercial mortgage banker.

Papale, who earned the nickname "Rocky" (after the Sylvester Stallone character) while playing with the Eagles, is the subject of the Disney movie Invincible, with Mark Wahlberg portraying him. In addition, Papale's legend was cited as a factor in the Eagles' signing of construction foreman/tight end Jeff Thomason for 2005's Super Bowl XXXIX.

== Personal life ==
Diagnosed with colorectal cancer in 2001, Papale recovered and has become a spokesman encouraging people to get regular check-ups. He has appeared in commercials for Thomas Jefferson University Hospital, encouraging others to be tested. He is also a motivational speaker.

Previously, Papale was the regional director of marketing and senior account executive for higher-education marketing at Sallie Mae. He resides in Jupiter, Florida, with his wife Janet and two children, Gabriella and Vinny, and remains a diehard Philadelphia Eagles football fan. He is also currently listed as the Secretary/Treasurer of the Philadelphia Chapter of the NFL Alumni Association. His son Vinny played wide receiver for the University of Delaware Blue Hens, the Tampa Bay Bandits, and is currently with the Memphis Showboats of the United Football League.
