= List of 2006 box office number-one films in Canada =

This is a list of films which have placed number one at the weekend box office in Canada during 2006.

== Weekend gross list ==
†	This implies the highest-grossing movie of the year.

#	Weekend End Date	Film	Weekend Gross (millions)	Notes
1	January 1, 2006	The Chronicles of Narnia: The Lion, the Witch and the Wardrobe	$2.21	
2	January 8, 2006	The Chronicles of Narnia: The Lion, the Witch and the Wardrobe	$1.71	Hostel was #1 in North America.
3	January 15, 2006	The Chronicles of Narnia: The Lion, the Witch and the Wardrobe	$0.98	Glory Road was #1 in North America.
4	January 22, 2006	Underworld: Evolution	$2.16	
5	January 29, 2006	Nanny McPhee	$1.10	Big Momma's House 2 was #1 in North America.
6	February 5, 2006	When a Stranger Calls	$1.38	
7	February 12, 2006	The Pink Panther	$1.71	
8	February 19, 2006	Eight Below	$1.93	
9	February 26, 2006	Eight Below	$1.46	Madea's Family Reunion was #1 in North America.
10	March 5, 2006	Eight Below	$1.04	Madea's Family Reunion was #1 in North America.
11	March 12, 2006	Failure to Launch	$1.46	
12	March 19, 2006	V for Vendetta	$2.08	
13	March 26, 2006	Inside Man	$2.33	
14	April 2, 2006	Ice Age: The Meltdown	$4.71	
15	April 9, 2006	Ice Age: The Meltdown	N/A	
16	April 16, 2006	Scary Movie 4	$3.47	
17	April 23, 2006	Silent Hill	$1.41	
18	April 30, 2006	RV	$1.19	
19	May 7, 2006	Mission: Impossible III	$4.40	
20	May 14, 2006	Mission: Impossible III	$2.21	
21	May 21, 2006	The Da Vinci Code	$8.72	The Da Vinci Code had the highest weekend debut of 2006.
22	May 28, 2006	X-Men: The Last Stand	$7.57	
23	June 4, 2006	X-Men: The Last Stand	$3.28	The Break-Up was #1 in North America.
24	June 11, 2006	Cars	$2.75	
25	June 18, 2006	The Fast and the Furious: Tokyo Drift	$1.71	Cars was #1 in North America.
26	June 25, 2006	Click	$2.41	
27	July 2, 2006	Superman Returns	$4.01	
28	July 9, 2006	Pirates of the Caribbean: Dead Man's Chest †	$8.36	Pirates of the Caribbean: Dead Man's Chest had the highest weekend debut of 2006 in North America.
29	July 16, 2006	Pirates of the Caribbean: Dead Man's Chest †	$5.12	
30	July 23, 2006	Pirates of the Caribbean: Dead Man's Chest †	$3.51	
31	July 30, 2006	Miami Vice	$2.27	
32	August 6, 2006	Talladega Nights: The Ballad of Ricky Bobby	$2.39	
33	August 13, 2006	Step Up	$1.77	Talladega Nights: The Ballad of Ricky Bobby was #1 in North America.
34	August 20, 2006	Snakes on a Plane	$1.18	
35	August 27, 2006	Invincible	$0.88	
36	September 3, 2006	Crank	$0.81	Invincible was #1 in North America.
37	September 10, 2006	The Covenant	$0.77	
38	September 17, 2006	Gridiron Gang	$0.93	
39	September 24, 2006	Jackass Number Two	$2.19	
40	October 1, 2006	Open Season	$1.92	
41	October 8, 2006	The Departed	$2.13	The Departed won the 79th Academy Award for Best Motion Picture of the Year.
42	October 15, 2006	The Departed	$1.82	The Grudge 2 was #1 in North America.
43	October 22, 2006	The Prestige	$1.53	
44	October 29, 2006	Saw III	$2.45	
45	November 5, 2006	Borat: Cultural Learnings of America for Make Benefit Glorious Nation of Kazakhstan	$2.35	
46	November 12, 2006	Borat: Cultural Learnings of America for Make Benefit Glorious Nation of Kazakhstan	$3.55	
47	November 19, 2006	Casino Royale	$5.24	Happy Feet was #1 in North America.
48	November 26, 2006	Casino Royale	$3.31	Happy Feet was #1 in North America.
49	December 3, 2006	Casino Royale	$2.36	Happy Feet was #1 in North America.
50	December 10, 2006	Casino Royale	$1.44	Apocalypto was #1 in North America.
51	December 17, 2006	The Pursuit of Happyness	$1.53	
52	December 24, 2006	Night at the Museum	$1.28	
53	December 31, 2006	Night at the Museum	$2.83	

== See also ==
- List of Canadian films
