= Norwood, Pennsylvania =

Borough in Pennsylvania, US

- Borough
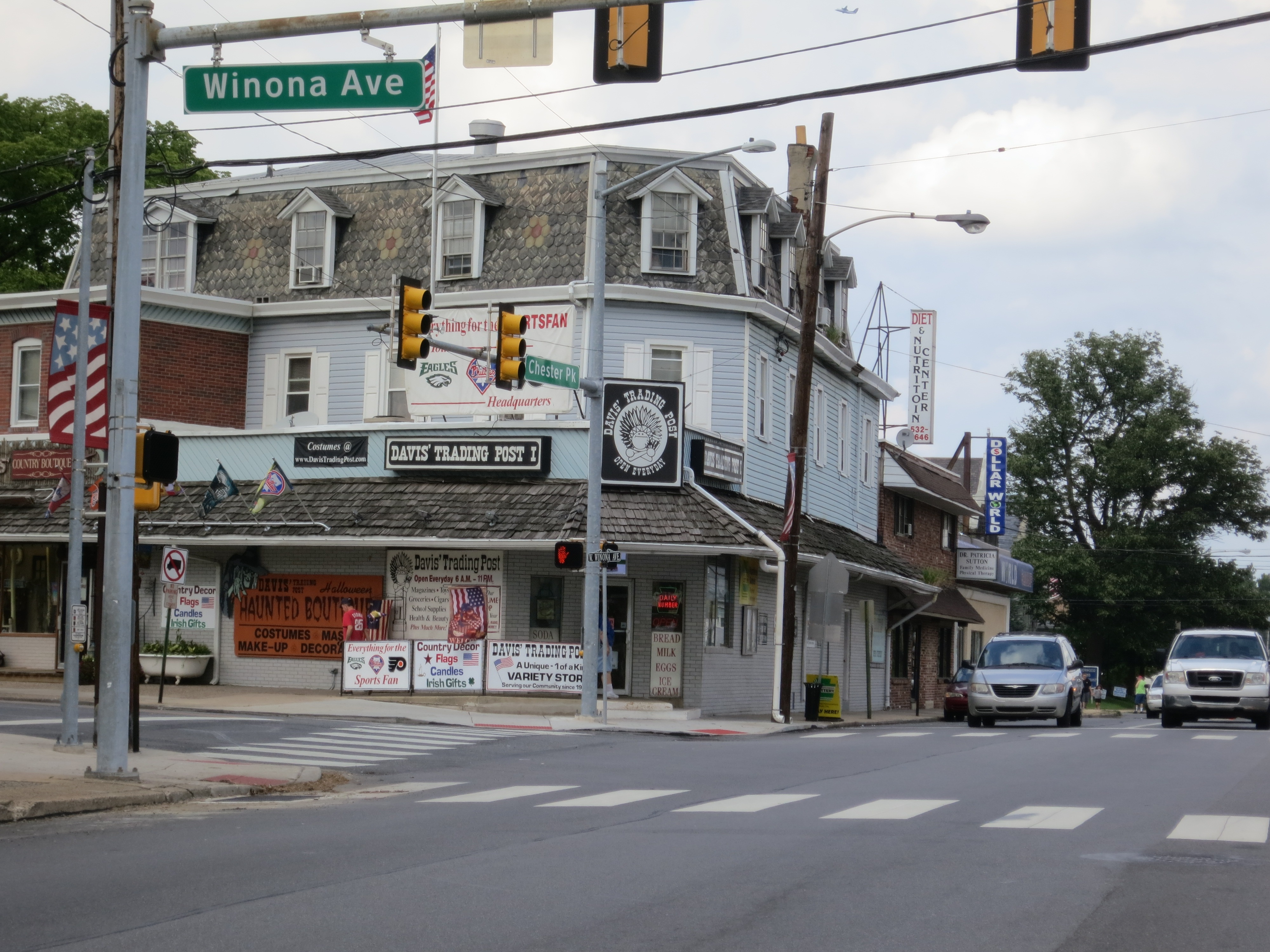
- Corner of Winona and Chester Pike (Facing the Davis’ Trading Post)

- Location in Delaware County and the U.S. state of Pennsylvania.

- Location of Norwood in Pennsylvania Norwood (the United States)
- Coordinates: 39°53′18″N 75°17′50″W
- Country: United States
- State: Pennsylvania
- County: Delaware

Area
  - Total: 0.81 sq mi (2.11 km^{2})
  - Land: 0.78 sq mi (2.01 km^{2})
  - Water: 0.039 sq mi (0.10 km^{2})
- Elevation: 82 ft (25 m)

Population (2020)
  - Total: 5,943
  - Density: 7,640.5/sq mi (2,950.02/km^{2})
- Time zone: UTC-5 (EST)
  - Summer (DST): UTC-4 (EDT)
- ZIP code: 19074
- Area codes: 610 and 484
- FIPS code: 42-045-55664
- FIPS code: 42-55664
- GNIS feature ID: 1182691
- Website: www.norwood-boro.org

Norwood is a borough that is located in Delaware County, Pennsylvania, United States. As of the 2020 census, Norwood had a population of 5,943.

== History ==
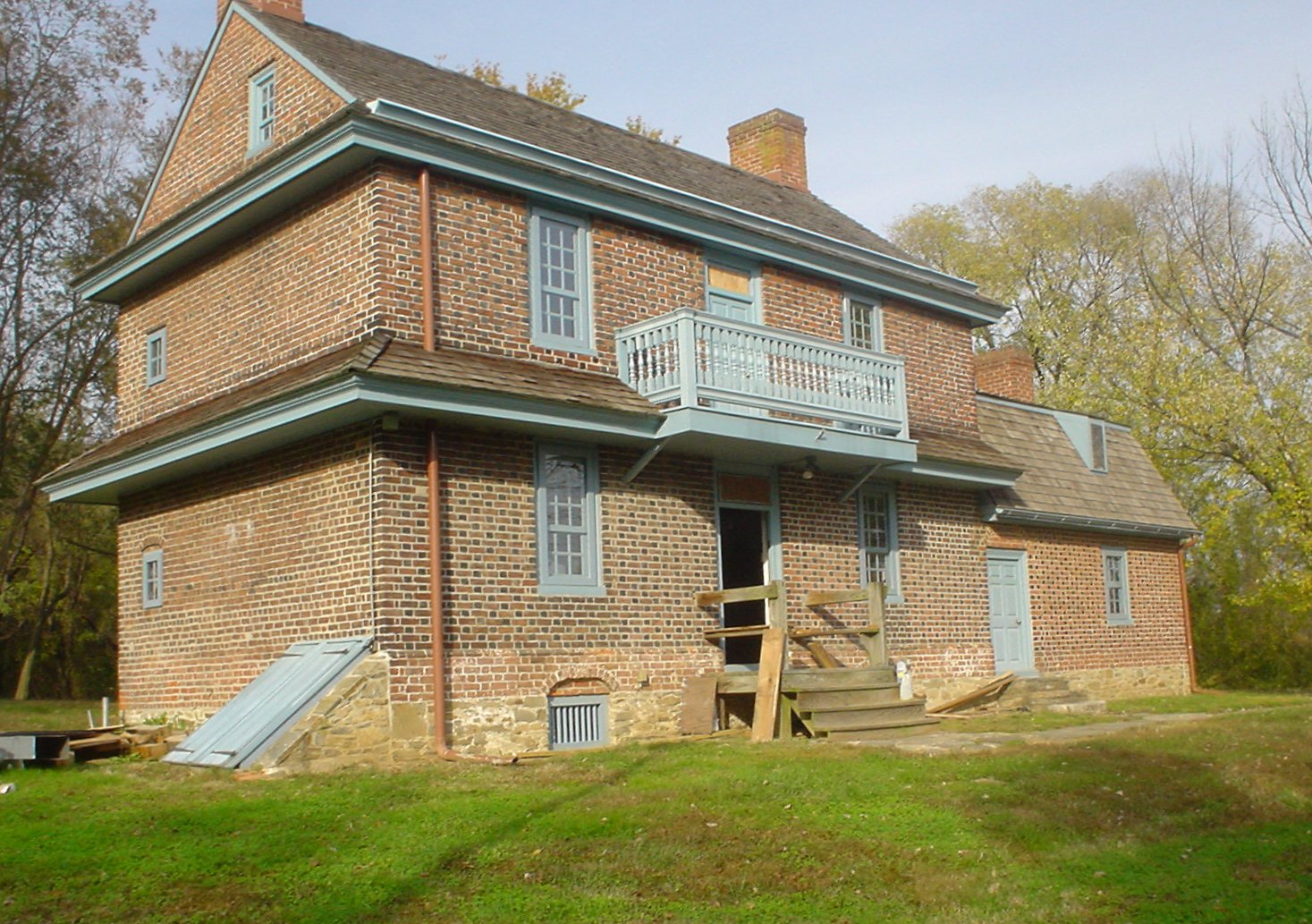
The Morton Morton House

The Morton Morton House is located at the confluence of the Muckinipattis Creek and Darby Creek. It was built circa 1750 by Morton Morton (1701–1781), the great-grandson of Marten Martenson, who was a settler in New Sweden in 1654. Morton Morton was also a first cousin to John Morton, one of the signers of the Declaration of Independence.

The Morton Morton House was listed on the National Register of Historic Places in 2000.

== Geography ==
Norwood is located in southeastern Delaware County at 39°53′18″N 75°17′50″W (39.888312, -75.297178). It is bordered to the northeast by Glenolden, to the east by Folcroft, to the south by Tinicum Township, to the west by Prospect Park, and to the west and north by Ridley Township.

Norwood is also bordered by Darby Creek to the south and the Muckinipattis Creek to the east.

According to the United States Census Bureau, Norwood has a total area of 0.81 square miles (2.1 km^{2}), of which 0.77 square miles (2.0 km^{2}) is land and 0.04 square miles (0.1 km^{2}), or 4.54%, is water.

== Demographics ==
Historical population
| Census | Pop. | Note | %± |
|---|---|---|---|
| 1880 | 194 | | — |
| 1900 | 1,286 | | — |
| 1910 | 1,668 | | 29.7% |
| 1920 | 2,353 | | 41.1% |
| 1930 | 3,878 | | 64.8% |
| 1940 | 3,921 | | 1.1% |
| 1950 | 5,246 | | 33.8% |
| 1960 | 6,729 | | 28.3% |
| 1970 | 7,229 | | 7.4% |
| 1980 | 6,647 | | −8.1% |
| 1990 | 6,162 | | −7.3% |
| 2000 | 5,985 | | −2.9% |
| 2010 | 5,890 | | −1.6% |
| 2020 | 5,943 | | 0.9% |
| 2024 (est.) | 5,969 | ▲ | 0.4% |

As of the 2020 census, the racial makeup of the borough was 91.0% White, 1.0% African American 0.0% Native American, 4.6% Asian, 2.2% from two or more races. Hispanic or Latino of any race comprised 5.4% of the population. This is compared to the 2010 census, where the racial makeup of the borough was 95.0% White, 1.5% African American, 0.1% Native American, 2.0% Asian, 0.6% from other races, and 0.9% from two or more race, with Hispanic or Latino of any race composing 1.4% of the population .

As of the census of 2000, there were 5,985 people, 2,286 households, and 1,536 families residing in the borough. The population density was 7,484.3 inhabitants per square mile (2,889.7/km^{2}). There were 2,363 housing units at an average density of 2,955.0 units per square mile (1,140.9 units/km^{2}). The racial makeup of the borough was 97.56% White, 1.10% African American, 0.05% Native American, 0.70% Asian, 0.18% from other races, and 0.40% from two or more races. Hispanic or Latino of any race were 0.74% of the population.

There were 2,286 households, out of which 33.2% had children under the age of 18 living with them, 51.3% were married couples living together, 12.4% had a female householder with no husband present, and 32.8% were non-families. 28.3% of all households were made up of individuals, and 9.9% had someone living alone who was 65 years of age or older. The average household size was 2.62 and the average family size was 3.26.

In the borough the population was spread out, with 26.3% under the age of 18, 7.7% from 18 to 24, 32.5% from 25 to 44, 21.5% from 45 to 64, and 12.0% who were 65 years of age or older. The median age was 36 years. For every 100 females there were 94.0 males. For every 100 females age 18 and over, there were 90.8 males.

The median income for a household in the borough was $47,043, and the median income for a family was $54,983. Males had a median income of $41,667 versus $28,315 for females. The per capita income for the borough was $20,513. About 4.6% of families and 7.6% of the population were below the poverty line, including 8.5% of those under age 18 and 10.4% of those age 65 or over.

== Education ==
Norwood lies within the Interboro School District. Norwood School serves students in grades K-8, and Interboro High School serves students in grades 9–12. The Kindergarten Academy, located in Prospect Park, Pennsylvania, also serves pupils who reside in Norwood at the Kindergarten level.

St. James Regional Catholic School in Ridley Park is the area Catholic school. It formed in 2012 from a merger of St. Gabriel Catholic School, located within the Norwood borough boundaries, and St. Madeline-St. Rose in Ridley Park. St. Gabriel opened in 1960, with another segment of the building opening in 1962. Former St. Gabriel teacher Denise Crane stated in a letter to the editor to the Delco Times that students came from Norwood, Folcroft, Glenolden, and Prospect Park. Donna Kowal, who began teaching at St. James in 1968, recalled that there were over 1,000 students at the time; each grade level had about 200 students, with about four classes with around 50 students each, but that by 2012 the student population figures had sharply declined. The final enrollment was around 164.

== Notable people ==
- Bill Foster, former Duke basketball coach
- Grover C. Talbot, Pennsylvania State Representative for Delaware County (1925–1934), 116th Speaker of the Pennsylvania House of Representatives (1933–1934)

== Transportation ==
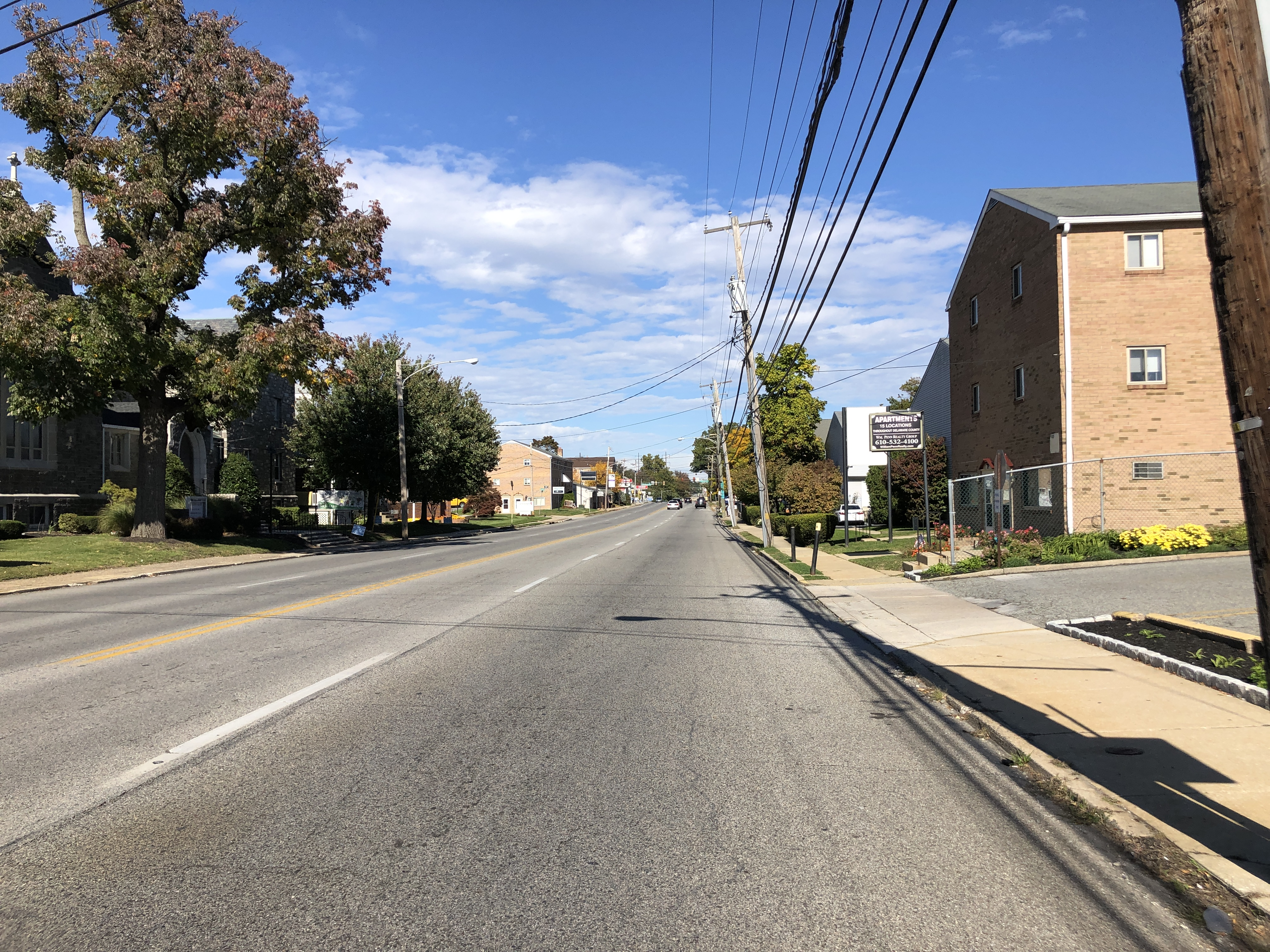
US 13 northbound in Norwood

As of 2017, there were 14.43 miles (23.22 km) of public roads in Norwood, of which 1.41 miles (2.27 km) were maintained by the Pennsylvania Department of Transportation (PennDOT) and 12.92 miles (20.79 km) were maintained by the borough.

U.S. Route 13 (Chester Pike) is the main road which runs through the borough, leading northeast 10 miles (16 km) to Center City Philadelphia and southwest 4.5 miles (7.2 km) to Chester.

Norwood station is a SEPTA Regional Rail station on the Wilmington/Newark Line that provides service to Center City Philadelphia and to Wilmington and Newark, Delaware. SEPTA also operates the Route 114 bus that makes stops on Chester Pike in Norwood along its route between the Darby Transportation Center in Darby and Wawa Station in Middletown Township.
