= Interboro High School =

Coordinates: 39.8933°N 75.3055°W

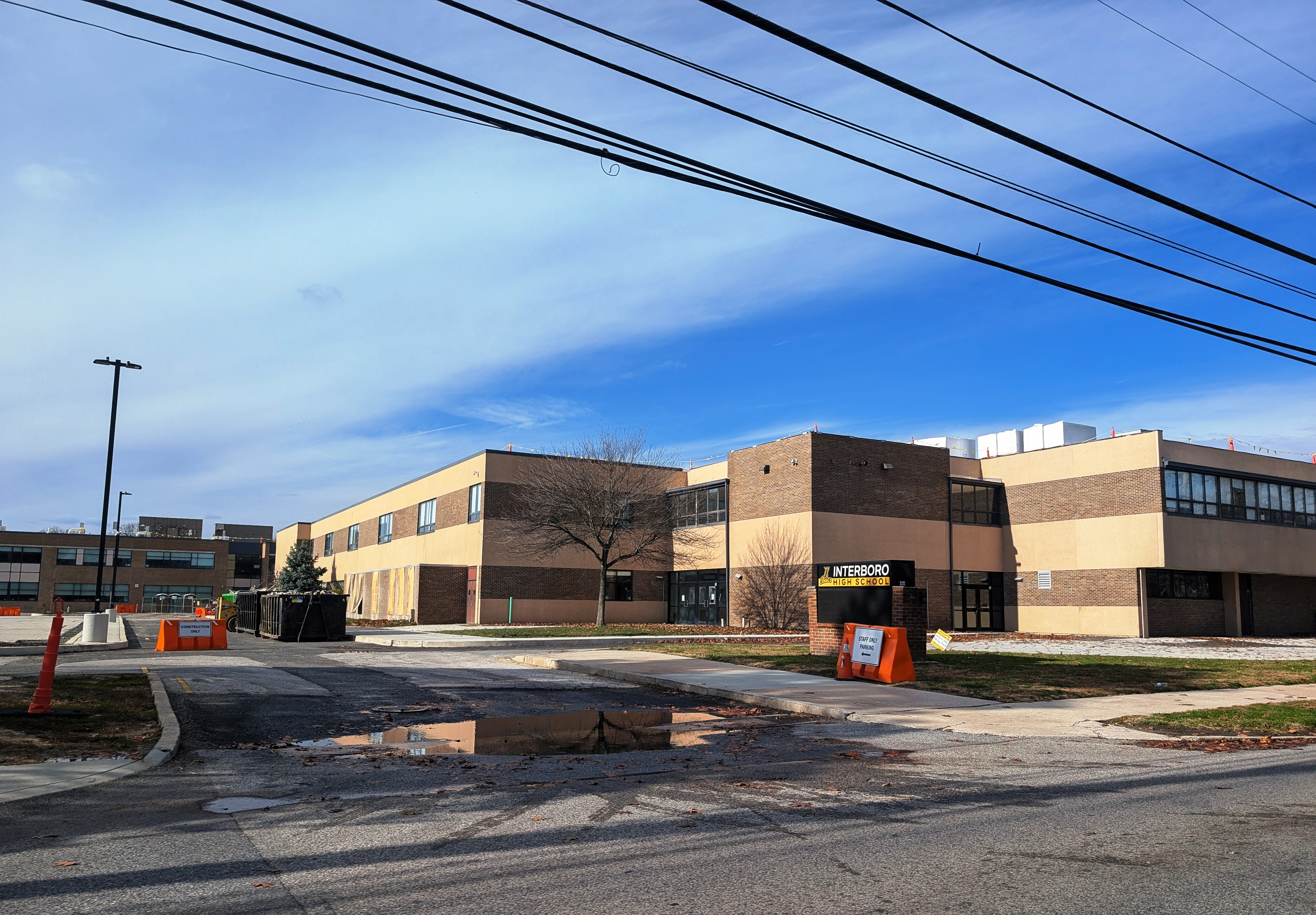
- 500 16th Avenue, Prospect Park, Pennsylvania 19076

Information
- Type: Public
- School district: Interboro School District
- Principal: Brian Lytz
- Staff: 82.50 (FTE)
- Grades: 9–12
- Enrollment: 1,028 (2022–2023)
- Student to teacher ratio: 12.46
- Colors: Black, Gold
- Team name: Buccaneers
- Rival: Ridley High School
- Website: ihs.interborosd.org

Interboro High School is a high school located in Prospect Park, Pennsylvania, part of the Philadelphia metropolitan area in the United States.

As the sole high school in the Interboro School District, students from surrounding communities Glenolden, Norwood, Prospect Park itself, and the two towns of Tinicum Township (Lester and Essington) attend grade levels 9–12 here.

The school district's school bus system is headquartered at the high school, as is ITV, a television studio broadcasting to all cable-ready homes in the district.

As of the 2018–2019 school year, IHS had a student body of 1,086.

== Notable alumni ==
- Vince Papale, American football wide receiver
