= Morton Homestead =

Historic house in Pennsylvania, United States

- U.S. National Register of Historic Places
- Pennsylvania state historical marker
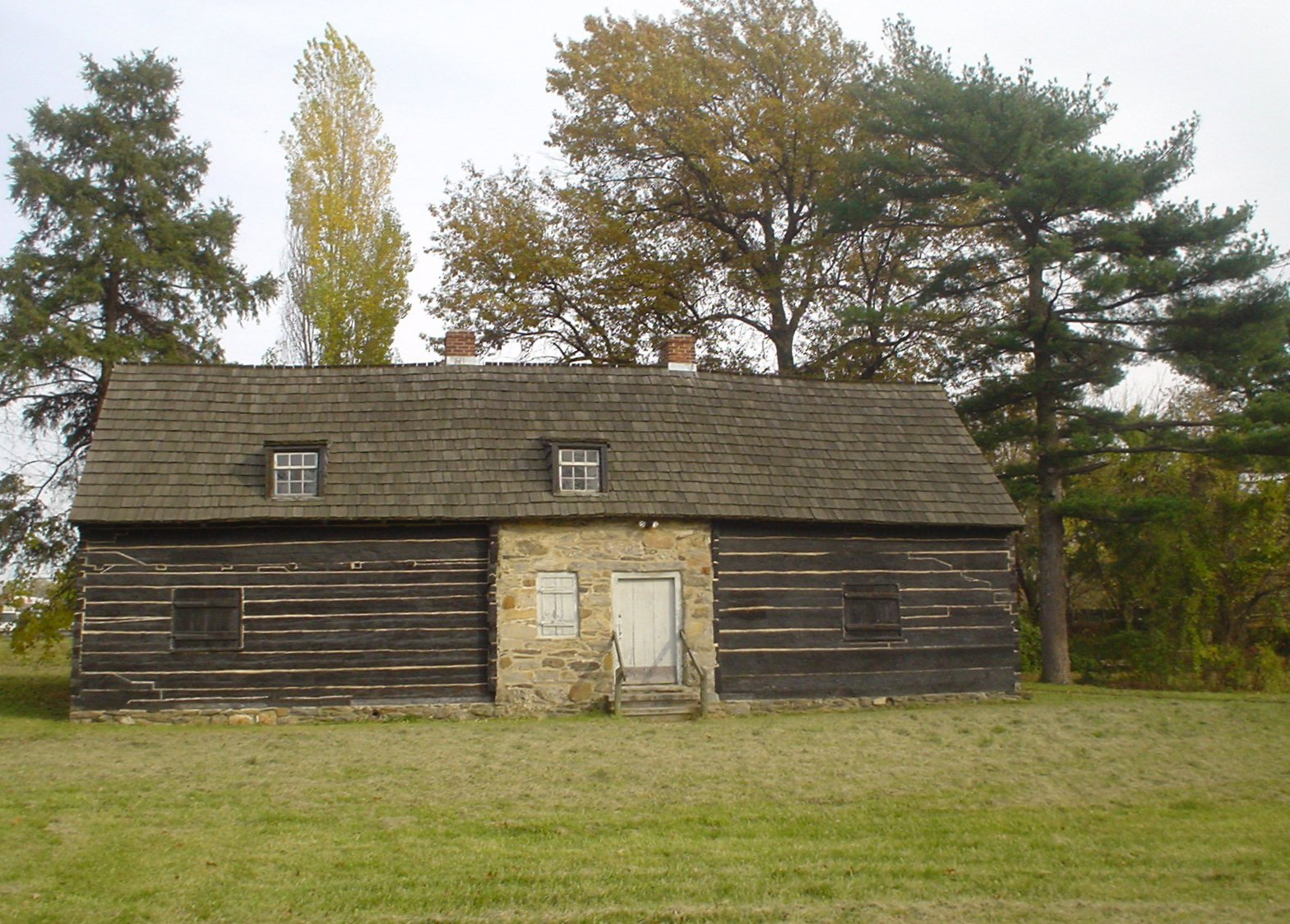
- Morton Homestead, November 2009

- Location within Pennsylvania Location within the United States
- Location: Prospect Park, Pennsylvania
- Coordinates: 39°52′37″N 75°18′21″W
- Area: 3 acres (1.2 ha)
- Built: c.1698
- NRHP reference No.: 70000546

Significant dates
- Added to NRHP: December 2, 1970
- Designated PHMC: September 09, 1966

The Morton Homestead is an historic homestead that is part of Morton Homestead State Park, which is located along Darby Creek at 100 Lincoln Avenue in Prospect Park, Delaware County, Pennsylvania, United States.

It was added to the National Register of Historic Places in 1970.

== History and architectural features ==
This homestead was founded in 1654 by Morton Mortenson, a Finnish immigrant, while the area was still part of the New Sweden colony. Mortenson's great-grandson, John Morton, signed the Declaration of Independence in 1776. Parts of the current house date back to the 1698 with a large addition constructed during the eighteenth century.

Mortenson also owned property on the other side of the Delaware River along Raccoon Creek.

== See also ==
- Mortonson–Van Leer Log Cabin
- List of the oldest buildings in Pennsylvania
