= Philadelphia Lazaretto =

United States historic place, first quarantine hospital in the United States

- The Lazaretto
- U.S. National Register of Historic Places
- Pennsylvania state historical marker
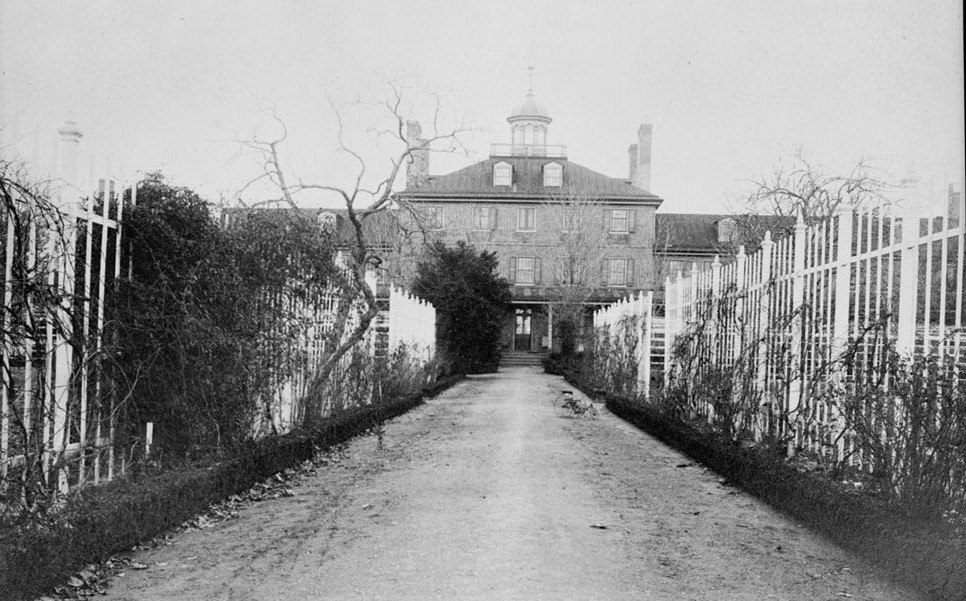
- Philadelphia Lazaretto in 1936

- Location within Pennsylvania Location within the United States
- Location: Wanamaker Avenue and 2nd Street, Essington, Pennsylvania, U.S.
- Coordinates: 39°51′38″N 75°18′2″W
- Area: 10 acres (40,000 m^{2})
- Built: 1799
- Architectural style: Georgian and Federal
- NRHP reference No.: 72001119

Significant dates
- Added to NRHP: March 16, 1972
- Designated PHMC: October 25, 2008

The Philadelphia Lazaretto was the second quarantine hospital in the United States, built in 1799, in Tinicum Township, Delaware County, Pennsylvania. The site was originally inhabited by the Lenni Lenape, and then the first Swedish settlers. Nearby Province Island was the site of the confinement of the Christian Moravian Indians who were brought there under protective custody from Lancaster, Pennsylvania, in 1763 when their lives were threatened by the Paxton Boys. The facility predates similar national landmarks such as Ellis Island Immigrant Hospital and Angel Island and is considered both the oldest surviving quarantine hospital and the last surviving example of its type in the U.S.

== History ==
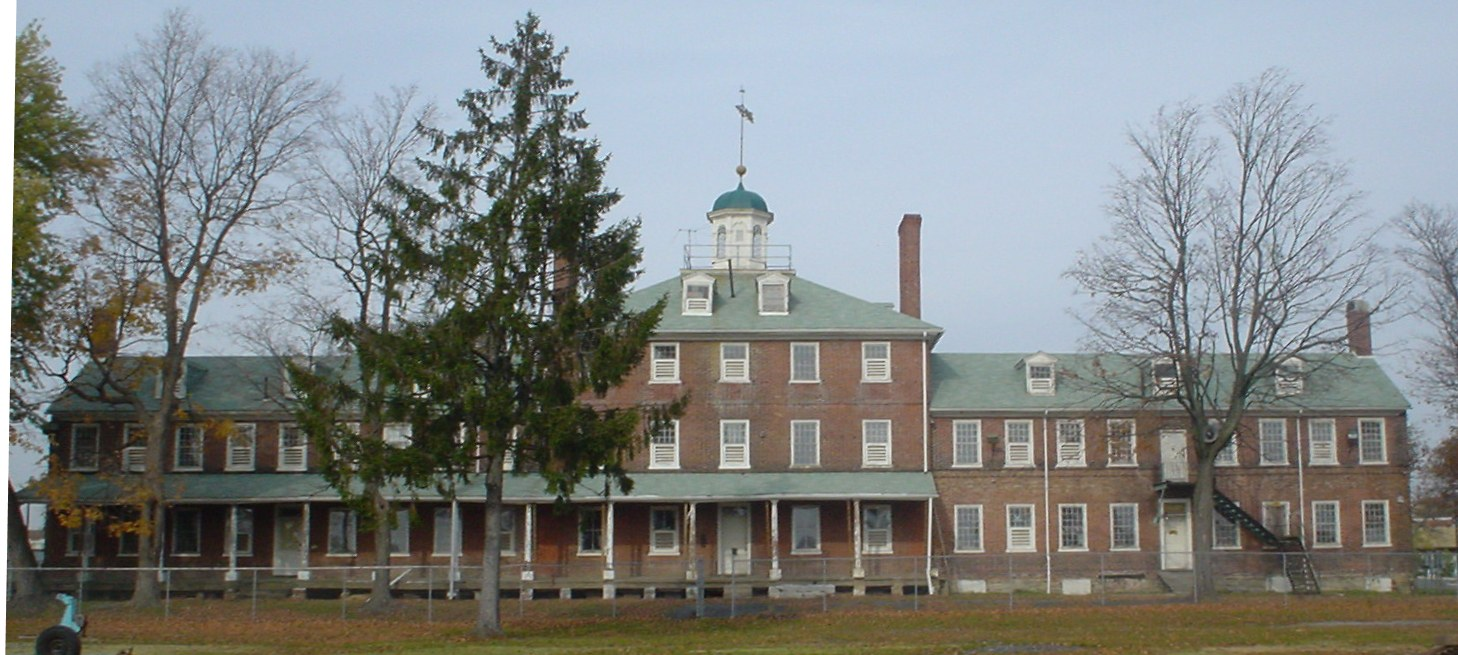
Philadelphia Lazaretto in Essington, Pennsylvania, November 2009

The first quarantine station in Philadelphia was erected in 1743 just southwest of where the Schuylkill and Delaware Rivers meet on present-day Penrose Ferry Road. A building was erected for use by sick people arriving at the port of Philadelphia and was known as the Pest House or the Old Lazaretto. The building was sold in 1802, with the proceeds used to help pay for the newly built Lazaretto, located about six miles west.

Efforts to control disease epidemics in the City of Philadelphia did not begin in earnest until after the devastating Yellow Fever Epidemic of 1793, which killed between 4,000 and 5,000 inhabitants—about one-tenth of the city's population at the time—and led the national government, which was then located there, to temporarily move out of the city. Following that epidemic, the commonwealth of Pennsylvania in 1798 created a Board of Health, controlled by the city, with the power to levy taxes for public health measures. The following year, the city Board of Health erected the Lazaretto on a 10-acre (40,000 m^{2}) site ten miles (16 km) south of the city on the banks of the Delaware in Tinicum Township.

In 1864, the municipal hospital of Philadelphia burned down and the board of health relocated it to the Lazaretto. Dr. J.L. Forwood managed the hospital at the Lazaretto until the new building were completed.

The new quarantine station included a hospital, offices, and residences. All passenger and cargo vessels bound for the port of Philadelphia were required to dock at the Lazaretto for inspection. Passengers suspected of contagion were quarantined in the hospital, and all suspect cargo was stored in the public warehouse. The Board of Health of the City of Philadelphia operated the facility and enforced the local quarantine regulations until the Commonwealth of Pennsylvania assumed authority for enforcing quarantine regulations in 1893. After it was closed as a hospital, it was used as an aviation base.

The building was listed in the National Register of Historic Places in 1972. In the early 21st century, the site was threatened with development, but the work of local preservationists saved it from leveling. Tinicum Township purchased the building in 2005 and subsequently refurbished the building to serve as township offices.

== See also ==
External videos
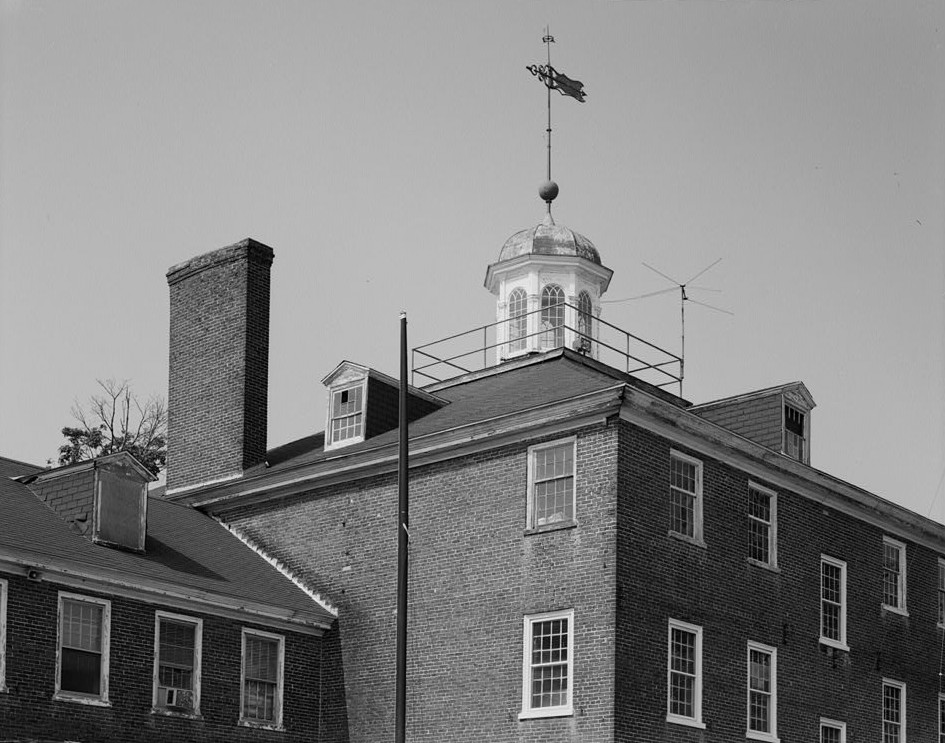
- The Historic Lazaretto, Ellis Island's Great-Grandfather, University of Pennsylvania

- Bedloe's Island
- Fort Mifflin
- Lazaretto
