= Morton Morton House =

Historic house in Pennsylvania, United States

- U.S. National Register of Historic Places
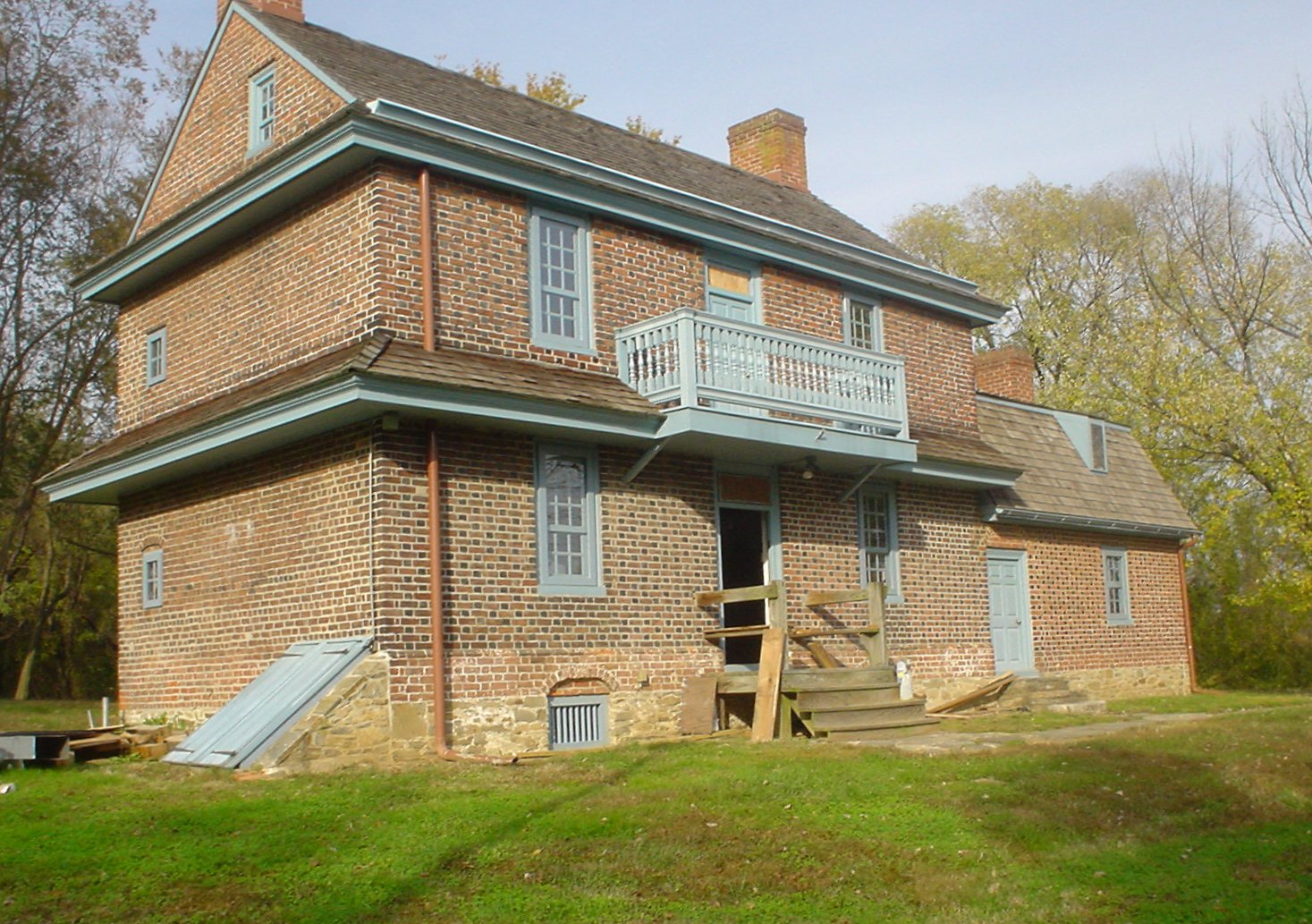
- Morton Morton House, November 2009

- Location within Pennsylvania Location within the United States
- Location: Jct. of Muckinipattis and Darby Creeks, Norwood, Pennsylvania
- Coordinates: 39°52′50″N 75°17′27″W
- Area: 5.5 acres (2.2 ha)
- Built: c. 1750
- Architect: Dickey, John (restoration)
- Architectural style: Colonial, Georgian
- NRHP reference No.: 00000055
- Added to NRHP: February 4, 2000

The Morton Morton House, also known as the Morton Mortonson House and the Morton and Lydia Morton House, is a historic, American home that is located in Norwood, Delaware County, Pennsylvania at the confluence of the Muckinipattis Creek and Darby Creek.

It was added to the National Register of Historic Places in 2000.

== History and architectural features ==
Built circa 1750, this historic structure consists of a two-story, symmetrical brick house with a gable roof and a 1 1/2-story wing with a gambrel roof. The interior has a Georgian hall-parlor plan. The building was restored in 1971 and is open as a historic house that is operated by the Norwood Historical Society.
