= Essington, Pennsylvania =

Unincorporated community in Pennsylvania, US

- Unincorporated community
- Location within Pennsylvania
- Coordinates: 39°51′43.41″N 75°17′49.67″W
- Country: United States
- State: Pennsylvania
- County: Delaware
- Township: Tinicum
- Elevation: 13 ft (4.0 m)
- Time zone: UTC-5 (EST)
  - Summer (DST): UTC-4 (EDT)
- ZIP Codes: 19029
- Area codes: 610 and 484
- GNIS feature ID: 1174326

Essington is an unincorporated community in Tinicum Township, Delaware County, Pennsylvania. The community is located on Tinicum Island along the shore of the Delaware River, and sits just southwest of the city of Philadelphia. The ZIP Code for Essington is 19029.

== History ==
The area of Essington was originally part of the New Sweden colony, the first European settlement in Pennsylvania. Fort Nya Gothenburg was constructed on Tinicum Island, and served as the capital of the colony. Johan Björnsson Printz, the governor of New Sweden, constructed his residence, The Printzhof, in Essington. The site's remains are located in present-day Governor Printz Park on 2nd Street.

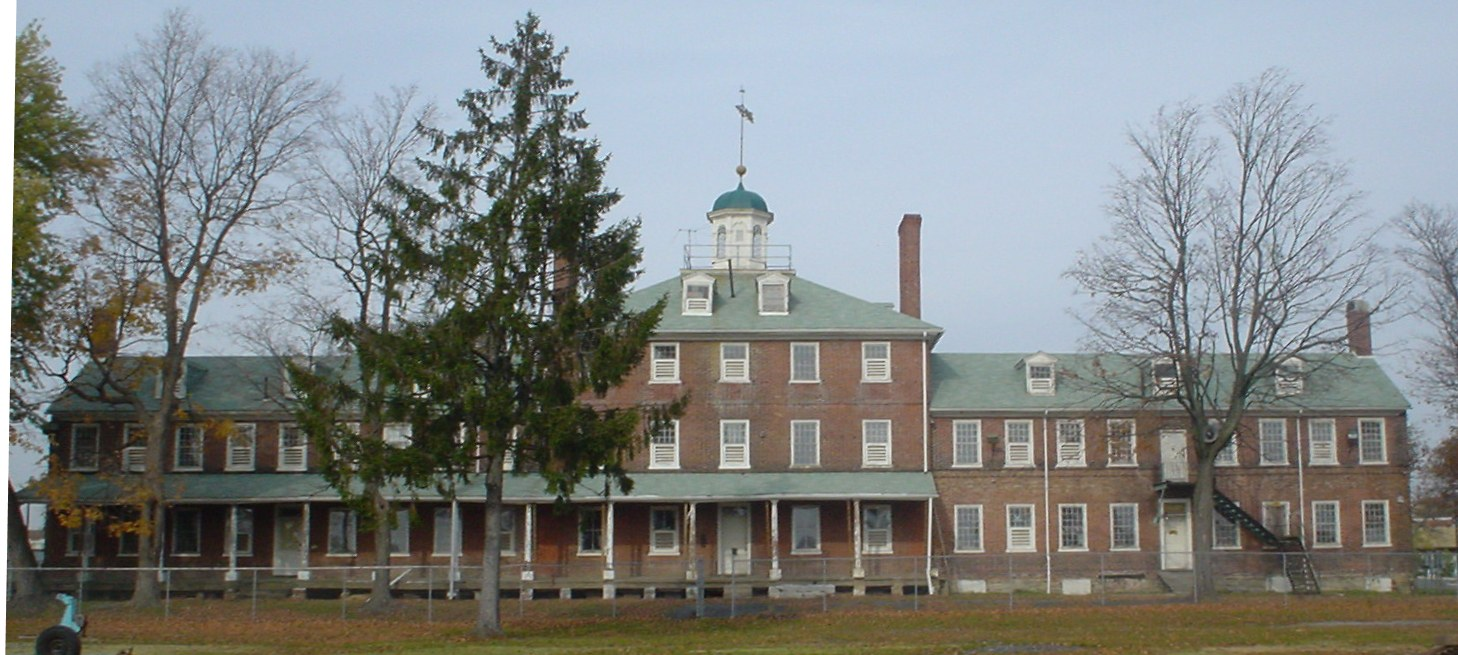
The Philadelphia Lazaretto in 2009

The Philadelphia Lazaretto was constructed in Essington in 1799 and served as one of the first quarantine hospitals in the United States. It still stands today on 2nd Street and is used as township offices.

=== Birth of stromboli ===
The stromboli is reported to have originated in 1950 in Essington at Romano's Italian Restaurant & Pizzeria, located on the corner of 3rd Street and Wanamaker Avenue. Restaurant owner Nazzareno "Naz" Romano is crediting with creating the dish, and William Schofield reportedly gave it the name "stromboli" after the 1950 film of the same name, which starred Ingrid Bergman. Others claim that the stromboli was the brainchild of Mike Aquino Sr., and that he created it in Spokane, Washington, in 1954.

== Education ==
Essington is part of the Interboro School District. Tinicum Elementary School is located within the community.

== Transportation ==
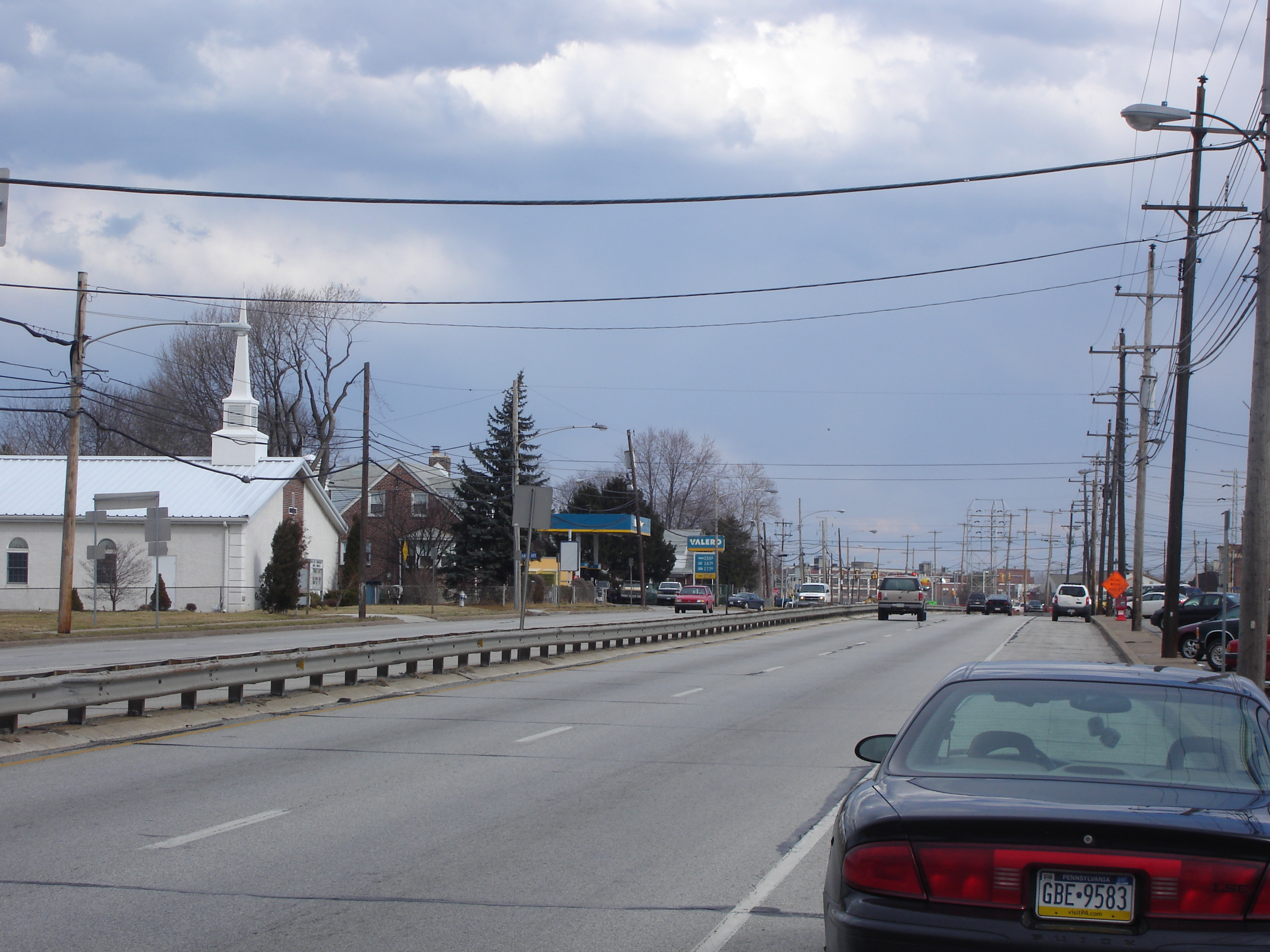
PA 291 (Industrial Highway) in Essington

Two state routes cross through Essington. Pennsylvania Route 291, known as Industrial Highway and Governor Printz Boulevard, serves as the main east–west route through the community. PA 291 connects Essington with Southwest Philadelphia to the east and Eddystone and Chester to the west. Pennsylvania Route 420 runs north–south through Essington along Wanamaker Avenue. PA 420 terminates at the intersection with PA 291, though Wanamaker Avenue continues through the rest of the community.

Interstate 95 runs along the northern border of Essington, and exit 9 on I-95 with PA 420 provides a connection to Essington.

Philadelphia International Airport is located immediately to the east of Essington, and several parking and lodging businesses exist in Essington to serve airport travelers.
