= Interboro School District =

School district in Pennsylvania

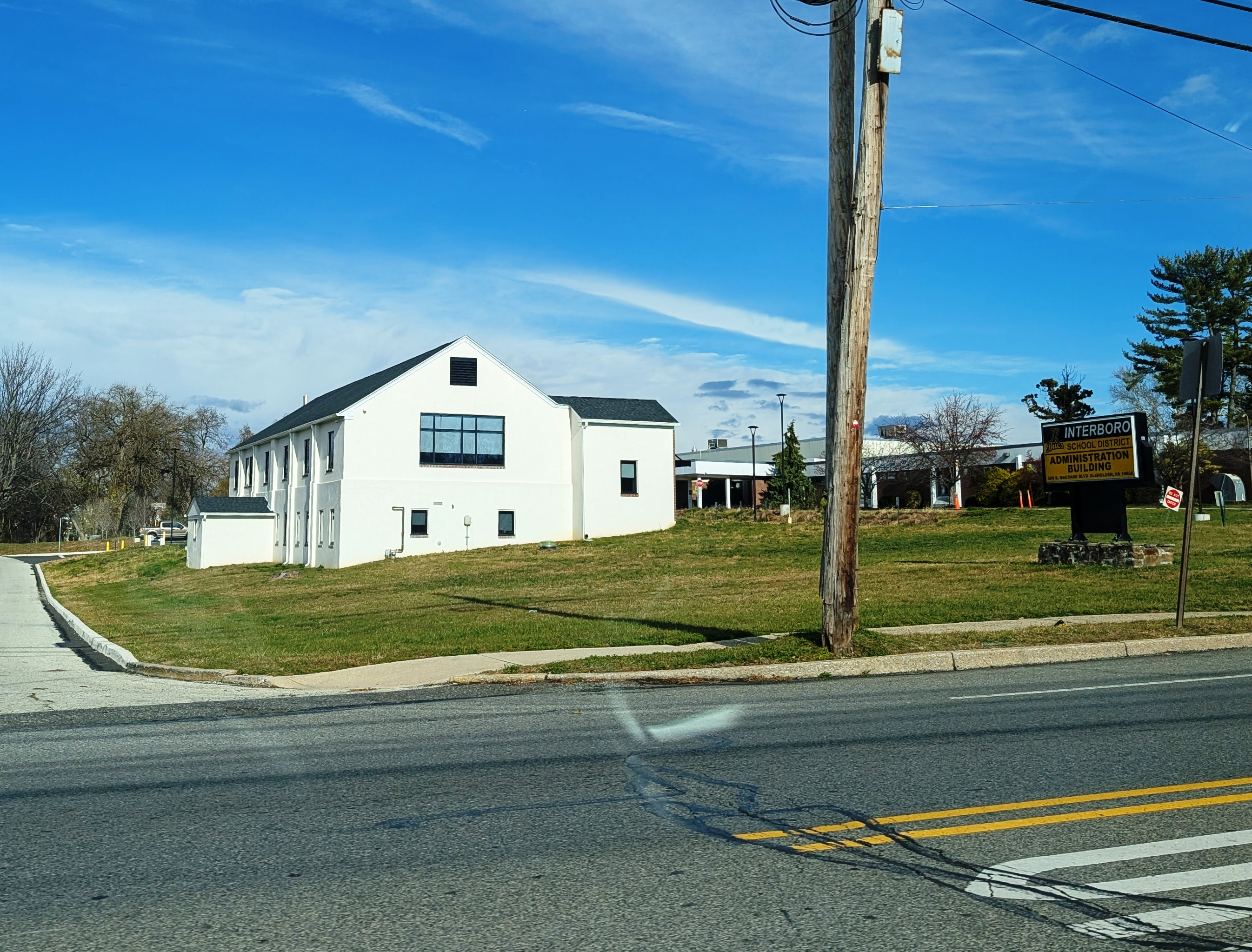
- District Administration Building

Address
- 200 South MacDade Boulevard Glenolden, Delaware, Pennsylvania; United States

District information
- Type: Public

Students and staff
- Colors: Black & Gold

Other information
- Website: www.interborosd.org

Interboro School District is a midsized, suburban public school district located in southeastern Pennsylvania, just outside Philadelphia in Delaware County. Interboro School District encompasses approximately 11 square miles (28 km^{2}).

The district is made up of four communities: the boroughs of Glenolden, Norwood, and Prospect Park, and Tinicum Township. At one time the area was divided into separate school districts: Glen-Nor, Prospect Park, and Lester. In 1955 Glen-Nor and Prospect Park joined with Lester being included later. The first graduating class of Interboro High School was in 1956 with 125 members.

According to 2018-22 ACS-ED data, the district serves a resident population of 23,515. The median household income is $69,721, versus a state median income of $73,170, and national median income of $75,149.

== Schools ==
There are six schools in this district:

- Interboro High School (grades 9–12)
- Glenolden School (grades 1–8)
- Norwood School (grades 1–8)
- Prospect Park School (grades 1–8)
- Tinicum School (grades 1–8)
- Interboro Kindergarten Academy (grades K – transitional 1st grade)
