= Tinicum Township, Delaware County, Pennsylvania =

Township in Pennsylvania, US

Tinicum Township, Pennsylvania
- Township
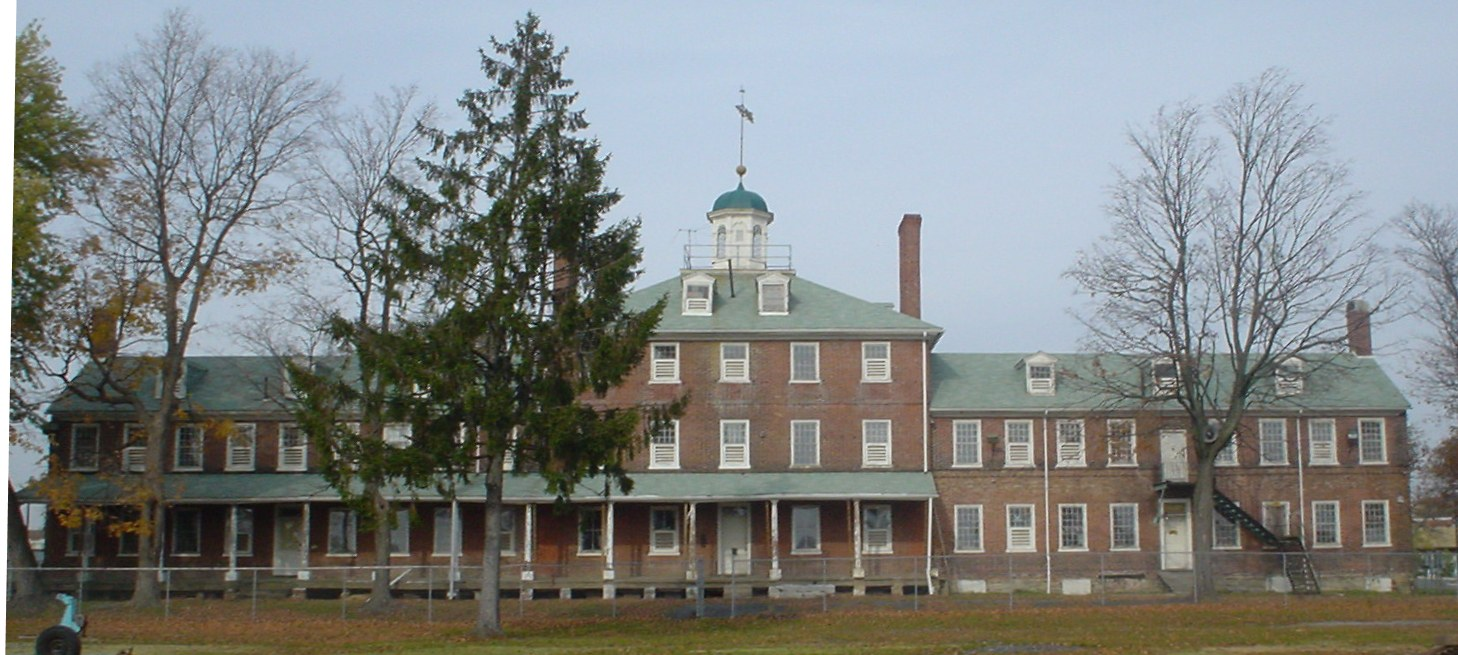
- The Philadelphia Lazaretto, November 2009

- Location in Delaware County and the U.S. state of Pennsylvania
- Coordinates: 39°52′15″N 75°16′57″W
- Country: United States
- State: Pennsylvania
- County: Delaware
- Settled: 1643

Area
  - Total: 8.78 sq mi (22.75 km^{2})
  - Land: 5.75 sq mi (14.90 km^{2})
  - Water: 3.03 sq mi (7.86 km^{2})
- Elevation: 13 ft (4.0 m)

Population (2010)
  - Total: 4,091
  - Estimate (2016): 4,103
  - Density: 713.4/sq mi (275.45/km^{2})
- Time zone: UTC-5 (EST)
  - Summer (DST): UTC-4 (EDT)
- ZIP Code: 19029
- Area codes: 610 and 484
- FIPS code: 42-045-76792
- Website: tinicumtownshipdelco.com

Tinicum Township, also known as Tinicum Island or The Island, is a township in Delaware County, Pennsylvania, United States. The population was 4,091 at the 2010 census, down from 4,353 at the 2000 census. Included within the township's boundaries are the communities of Essington and Lester.

John Heinz National Wildlife Refuge at Tinicum is located in the township and attracts visitors year-round. Philadelphia International Airport's international terminal, the western end of the airfield, and runways 9L/27R and 9R/27L are also located in the township.

== History ==
Tinicum Township has the distinction of being the site of the first recorded European settlement in Pennsylvania. Fort Nya Gothenborg, located on the South River, was settled by colonial Swedes in 1643. It served as capital of the New Sweden colony, under the rule of Royal Governor Johan Björnsson Printz. Governor Printz built his manor house, The Printzhof, on Tinicum Island, from which he administered the colony. The original Lenape called the place Mahtanikunk, meaning "where they catch up with each other". The township is the site of the Philadelphia Lazaretto, the first quarantine hospital in the United States. It and the Printzhof are listed on the National Register of Historic Places.

=== Birth of stromboli ===
The stromboli is reported by Peter Romano to have originated in 1950 in Tinicum Township at Romano's Italian Restaurant & Pizzeria, by his grandfather Nazzareno Romano. There, William Schofield supposedly gave it the name, after the movie Stromboli, starring Ingrid Bergman. Others claim that the stromboli was the brainchild of Mike Aquino Sr., and that he created it in Spokane, Washington, in 1954.

== Geography ==
Tinicum Township is located in southeastern Delaware County at 39°52′8″N 75°17′17″W (39.868962, -75.288273). It is bordered to the south by the Delaware River, to the west and northwest by Darby Creek, and to the northeast by the city of Philadelphia. The township borders the state of New Jersey at the center of the Delaware River. The unincorporated community of Essington is in the western part of the township, and Lester is directly to its east. The western part of Philadelphia International Airport takes up nearly all of the center and eastern parts of the township. The John Heinz National Wildlife Refuge lies along Darby Creek on the northwestern side of the township.

According to the U.S. Census Bureau, the township has a total area of 8.8 square miles (22.7 km^{2}), of which 5.8 square miles (14.9 km^{2}) is land and 3.0 square miles (7.8 km^{2}), or 34.33%, is water. It has a humid subtropical climate (Cfa) and average monthly temperatures in Essington range from 33.6 °F in January to 78.4 °F in July. The hardiness zone is mainly 7b with a little area of 7a and the average annual absolute minimum temperature in Essington is 5.2 °F.

== Demographics ==
Historical population
Census	Pop.	Note	%±
1930	3,630		—
1940	3,792		4.5%
1950	5,314		40.1%
1960	4,375		−17.7%
1970	4,906		12.1%
1980	4,291		−12.5%
1990	4,440		3.5%
2000	4,353		−2.0%
2010	4,091		−6.0%
2020	3,983		−2.6%

As of 2010 census, the racial makeup of the township was 93.7% White, 1.7% African American, 0.2% Native American, 2.0% Asian, 0.4% from other races, and 1.9% from two or more races. Hispanic or Latino of any race were 2.2% of the population .

== Economy ==
When Scott Paper Company was an independent company, it had its headquarters in International Plaza (Scott Plaza) in Tinicum Township.

== Education ==
Tinicum Township is part of the Interboro School District. Tinicum Township is the district's only township, since the remaining municipalities having borough status. Tinicum School and Interboro High School (which is in Prospect Park) serve the township.

All-State Career School has two campuses in the Tinicum Township, in Lester and Essington.

== Transportation ==
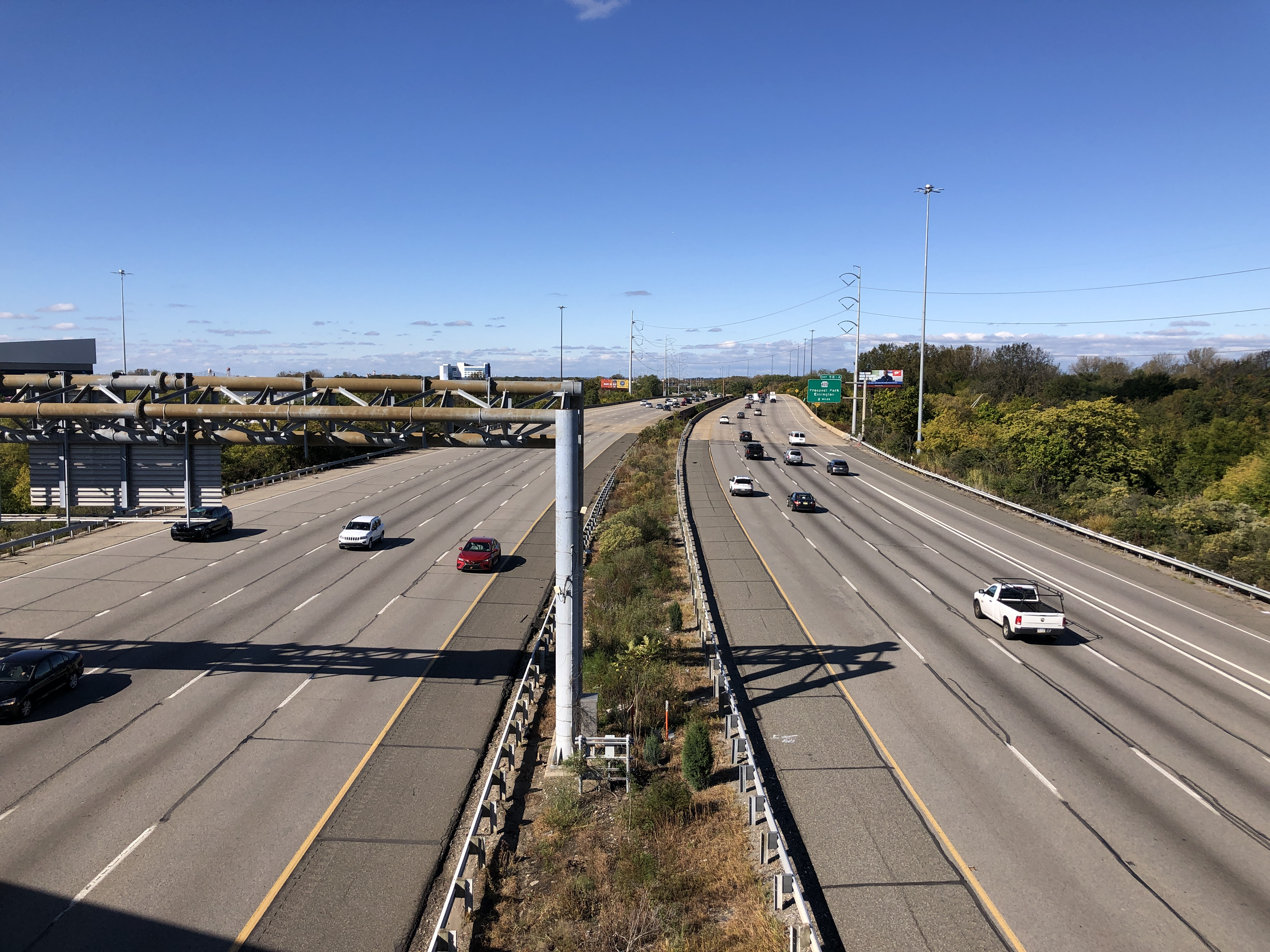
I-95 southbound in Tinicum Township

As of 2018, there were 29.22 miles (47.03 km) of public roads in Tinicum Township, of which 10.00 miles (16.09 km) were maintained by Pennsylvania Department of Transportation (PennDOT) and 19.22 miles (30.93 km) were maintained by the township.

Interstate 95 is the main highway serving Tinicum Township. It follows the Delaware Expressway along an east-west alignment through northwestern sections of the township. Pennsylvania Route 291 follows Industrial Highway parallel to and slightly south of I-95. Pennsylvania Route 420 begins at PA 291, heads north, interchanges with I-95, and exits the northwestern edge of the township.

Part of Philadelphia International Airport lies within Tinicum Township.

SEPTA provides bus service to Tinicum Township along City Bus Route 37, which runs between the Chester Transit Center and South Philadelphia via the Philadelphia International Airport, City Bus Route 68, which runs between the 69th Street Transportation Center and South Philadelphia, Suburban Bus Route 108, which runs between the 69th Street Transportation Center and the Philadelphia International Airport, and Suburban Bus Route 115, which runs between Delaware County Community College, the Darby Transportation Center, and the Philadelphia International Airport.

== Taxation ==
Employers who maintain worksites in Pennsylvania or employ individuals who may work from their homes are required to withhold applicable Earned Income Tax (EIT) from those employees. This is a result of Act 32, which consolidated the tax collecting entities for the state of Pennsylvania. The current Earned Income tax rate for Tinicum Township workers is 1.0%. This tax must be withheld from employee pay and paid to the representative of the local tax collector, Keystone Collections Group.

Preceded by West Deptford Township, New Jersey; Gloucester County	Bordering communities of Philadelphia	Succeeded by Folcroft
