= Prospect Park, Pennsylvania =

Borough in Pennsylvania, US

- Borough
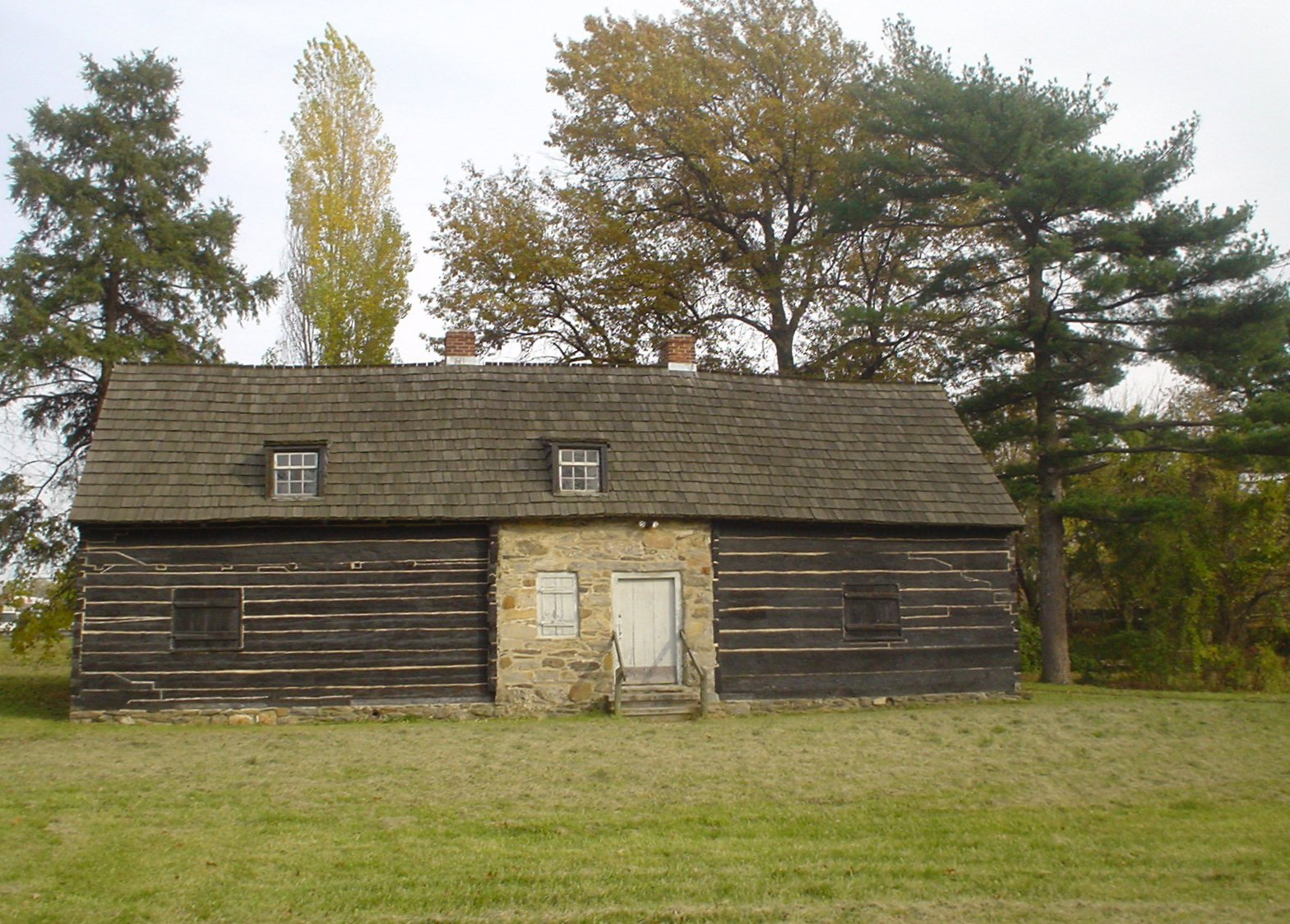
- The Morton Homestead, built 1698

- Location in Delaware County and the U.S. state of Pennsylvania.

- Location of Prospect Park in Pennsylvania Prospect Park (the United States)
- Coordinates: 39°53′09″N 75°18′26″W
- Country: United States
- State: Pennsylvania
- County: Delaware

Area
  - Total: 0.75 sq mi (1.93 km^{2})
  - Land: 0.73 sq mi (1.90 km^{2})
  - Water: 0.012 sq mi (0.03 km^{2})
- Elevation: 75 ft (23 m)

Population (2020)
  - Total: 6,427
  - Density: 8,783.1/sq mi (3,391.19/km^{2})
- Time zone: UTC-5 (EST)
  - Summer (DST): UTC-4 (EDT)
- ZIP code: 19076
- Area codes: 610 and 484
- FIPS code: 42-045-62792
- FIPS code: 42-62792
- GNIS feature ID: 1184455
- Website: prospectparkboro.com

Prospect Park is a borough in Delaware County, Pennsylvania, United States. As of the 2020 census, Prospect Park had a population of 6,427. It originated as a bedroom community of Philadelphia. It is located within 10 miles (16 km) of Center City, Philadelphia, with convenient rail access (SEPTA, and connection to Amtrak).

== History ==
In 1874, John Cochran of Chester purchased 103 acres from Joshua Pierson with the intention of dividing the property into lots and selling them. These properties formed the current community of Prospect Park.

Prospect Hill Baptist Church in Prospect Park claims a prominent role in instituting the phrase "In God We Trust" on United States coins and currency. A former pastor, Mark R. Watkinson, felt that the Civil War was going to leave the country with a bad name, "brother fighting brother in a civil war", and wrote a letter to Salmon P. Chase, Secretary of the Treasury, suggesting "God, Liberty, Law," be put on the coins. Chase referred the matter to James B. Longacre, Mint Engraver. A committee later settled on "In God We Trust", and the words first appeared on a 2-cent coin. A plaque on the outside of the church announces the birthplace of the phrase.

The Morton Homestead, one of the oldest buildings in Pennsylvania, was listed on the National Register of Historic Places in 1970.

== Geography ==
Prospect Park is located in southeastern Delaware County at 39°53′9″N 75°18′26″W (39.885712, -75.307166). It is bordered to the east by Norwood, to the south by Tinicum Township, to the west by Ridley Park, and to the west and north by Ridley Township.

According to the United States Census Bureau, the borough of Prospect Park has a total area of 0.73 square miles (1.9 km^{2}), of which 0.01 square miles (0.03 km^{2}), or 1.57%, is water.

== Transportation ==
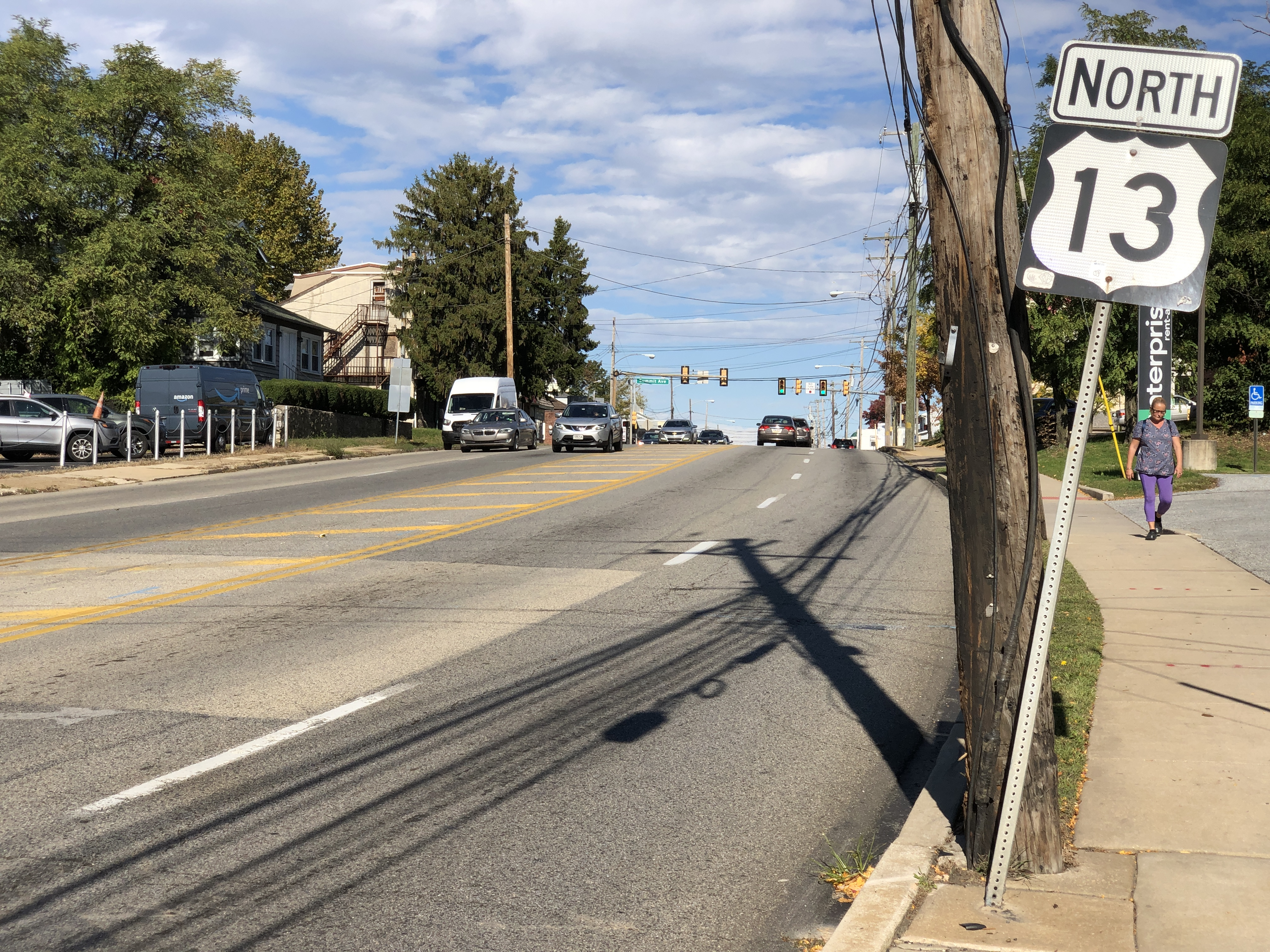
US 13 northbound in Prospect Park

As of 2010, there were 15.18 miles (24.43 km) of public roads in Prospect Park, of which 2.71 miles (4.36 km) were maintained by the Pennsylvania Department of Transportation (PennDOT) and 12.47 miles (20.07 km) were maintained by the borough.

U.S. Route 13 crosses the borough, leading northeast to Philadelphia and southwest 4 miles (6 km) to Chester. Pennsylvania Route 420 (Lincoln Avenue) crosses US 13 and leads north 2 miles (3 km) to Morton and south 1 mile (1.6 km) to Interstate 95 at Exit 9.

Prospect Park Station is a SEPTA train station on the Wilmington/Newark Line.

== Demographics ==
Historical population
Census	Pop.	Note	%±
1880	197		—
1900	1,059		—
1910	1,655		56.3%
1920	2,536		53.2%
1930	4,623		82.3%
1940	5,100		10.3%
1950	5,834		14.4%
1960	6,596		13.1%
1970	7,250		9.9%
1980	6,593		−9.1%
1990	6,764		2.6%
2000	6,594		−2.5%
2010	6,454		−2.1%
2020	6,427		−0.4%

As of Census 2010, the racial makeup of the borough was 92.6% White, 3.0% African American, 0.2% Native American, 1.8% Asian, 0.6% from other races, and 1.8% from two or more races. Hispanic or Latino of any race were 1.9% of the population .

As of the census of 2000, there were 6,594 people, 2,577 households, and 1,600 families residing in the borough. The population density was 8,859.7 inhabitants per square mile (3,420.7/km^{2}). There were 2,683 housing units at an average density of 3,604.9 per square mile (1,391.9/km^{2}). The racial makeup of the borough was 95.44% White, 1.38% African American, 0.12% Native American, 1.74% Asian, 0.02% Pacific Islander, 0.39% from other races, and 0.91% from two or more races. Hispanic or Latino of any race were 0.91% of the population.

There were 2,577 households, out of which 32.4% had children under the age of 18 living with them, 46.0% were married couples living together, 12.1% had a female householder with no husband present, and 37.9% were non-families. 30.9% of all households were made up of individuals, and 8.7% had someone living alone who was 65 years of age or older. The average household size was 2.49 and the average family size was 3.20.

In the borough, the population was spread out, with 25.6% under the age of 18, 8.2% from 18 to 24, 32.4% from 25 to 44, 19.9% from 45 to 64, and 13.8% who were 65 years of age or older. The median age was 36 years. For every 100 females, there were 92.5 males. For every 100 females age 18 and over, there were 89.9 males.

The median income for a household in the borough was $45,244, and the median income for a family was $51,966. Males had a median income of $38,914 versus $30,717 for females. The per capita income for the borough was $19,801. There are 3.6% of families living below the poverty line and 4.3% of the population, including 2.6% of under eighteens and 12.1% of those over 64.

== Education ==
Students living in Prospect Park attend classes within the Interboro School District, which consists of Prospect Park and its neighboring regions Glenolden, Norwood, and Tinicum Township.

The school district's administrative offices are located within the borough, as is Interboro High School.

== Notable person ==
W. Carter Merbreier created and co-hosted the long-running syndicated children's television series, Captain Noah and His Magical Ark, in 1967. He was born in Prospect Park on August 26, 1926.
