= Invincible (2006 film) =

2006 film by Ericson Core

- Theatrical release poster
- Directed by: Ericson Core
- Written by: Brad Gann
- Produced by: Gordon Gray; Mark Ciardi
- Starring: Mark Wahlberg; Greg Kinnear; Elizabeth Banks; Michael Rispoli
- Cinematography: Ericson Core
- Edited by: Gerald B. Greenberg
- Music by: Mark Isham
- Production companies: Walt Disney Pictures; Mayhem Pictures
- Distributed by: Buena Vista Pictures Distribution
- Release date: August 25, 2006
- Running time: 105 minutes
- Country: United States
- Language: English
- Budget: $30 million
- Box office: $58.5 million

Invincible is a 2006 American biographical sports drama film directed by Ericson Core. It is based on the story of Vince Papale (played by Mark Wahlberg), a bartender who became a member of the Philadelphia Eagles in 1976 with the help of his coach, Dick Vermeil (Greg Kinnear); Elizabeth Banks and Michael Rispoli also star. The film was released in the United States on August 25, 2006, receiving generally positive reviews.

== Plot ==
In 1976, Philadelphia is in chaos as portions of the city protest the shutdown of several job sites while their NFL team, the Philadelphia Eagles, endure a string of losing seasons. Vince Papale, a 30-year-old substitute teacher, comes home from a pick-up football game one night and finds his wife Sharon disgusted with his failure to better support their family. The next day Papale is unexpectedly laid off from his day job at school. At the bar where he moonlights as a bartender, he sees a TV report about the Eagles hiring a new head coach, Dick Vermeil and staging open public tryouts for the Eagles. The bar regulars, die-hard Eagles fans, encourage Papale to try out. He returns home to find Sharon has left him, leaving only a note.

Papale welcomes a new co-worker to the bar, Janet Cantrell, who is a fan of the rival New York Giants. Desperate for income , Papale receives support from his friends and attends the Eagles tryout at Veterans Stadium with several hundred Philadelphia residents. Dick Vermeil encounters Papale after the tryout in the parking lot and invites him to training camp to compete for a roster spot with the Eagles. Papale endures hard training and disrespect from other players at training camp and hesitantly takes Janet out on a date, unsure if it will distract from his goal of making the team. Janet confesses she doesn't consider the outing a romantice date. Training camp closes with Vermeil assigning the final spot on the team to Papale, against the advice of the assistant coaches.

The Eagles begins the season by losing all six pre-season games. Papale plays poorly in the regular season opener, an away game against the Dallas Cowboys, which they also lose, and Vermeil faces pressure from the fans and media. Papale visits the sandlot where he once played. He initially declines to join them because of his upcoming Eagles game but eventually takes part to help his friends beat a competing team, and ends the game by throwing a touchdown pass. He encounters Janet afterwards and end up passionately embracing and returning together to Papale's home.

During the home opener against the Giants, Janet's appearance in the stands in a Giants shirt angers Eagles fans. In the locker room, Papale looks again at the note Sharon had left claiming "he will never amount to anything" and tears it up. He opens the game by solo-tackling the kickoff returner inside the fifteen-yard line. After an up-and-down game, Papale gets downfield during an Eagles' fourth quarter punt to tackle the returner, forcing a fumble that he recovers and takes into the end zone for a touchdown, sealing his first win as an Eagle. Highlights of Papale's career with the Eagles run during the end credits, revealing that Papale played for three seasons and married Janet. Vermeil's success in turning the Eagles into a winning team culminated in the Eagles reaching Super Bowl XV.

== Cast ==
- Mark Wahlberg as Vince Papale
- Greg Kinnear as Dick Vermeil
- Elizabeth Banks as Janet Cantwell
- Michael Rispoli as Max
- Kevin Conway as Frank "Kingie" Papale
- Kirk Acevedo as Tommy
- Dov Davidoff as Johnny
- Michael Kelly as Pete
- Nicoye Banks as TJ Banks
- Stink Fisher as Dennis "Denny" Franks
- Michael Mulheren as AC Craney
- Michael Nouri as Leonard Tose
- Jack Kehler as Wade Chambers
- Paige Turco as Carol Vermeil
- Lola Glaudini as Sharon Papale
- Morgan Turner as Susan Vermeil
- Randy Couture as "Toruci" Player #1
- Earle Masciulli as "Toruci" Player #2
- Rick Reilly as Disgruntled Fan
- Tony Luke Jr. as Cape-Clad Fan
- G.J. Crescione as Giants Player #23, who makes crushing hit on Mark Wahlberg

== Differences from the true story ==
In reality, Papale started playing football in the Delaware County Rough Touch League (PA) in the late 1960s before his semi-professional and pro football experience. He then played with the semi-pro Aston Green Knights of the Seaboard Football League and two seasons with the Philadelphia Bell of the World Football League, one of the NFL's rival leagues on the level of the AFL and the USFL. Papale was a standout special teams star for the Bell, who played at Philadelphia's JFK Stadium.

Mark Wahlberg was shorter (5'8") than Vince Papale, who stood at 6'2" while playing for the Eagles. Mark Wahlberg was closer to Vince Papale's high-school height of 5'7".

Vince Papale's first wife did leave him, leaving a similar note. However, that happened in 1971, five years before the events of the movie.

The movie portrays Vince meeting Janet before the tryouts. In real life, Papale dated and married his second wife, Sandy during the movie's time frame. He was divorced and met Janet after his Eagles career as the couple married in 1993.

Papale did participate in an open tryout before earning his spot on the Bell roster, which the filmmakers used as a model for the tryout shown in the movie. For the Eagles, Papale actually participated in a private workout that was by invitation only.

The opening scene of the movie features the Eagles' 31−0 loss to the Cincinnati Bengals on December 7, 1975. One of the fans makes a comment that the Eagles lost to a team worse than they were. In 1975, the Bengals actually went 11–3 and were the wild card team in the AFC.

The game versus the New York Giants is depicted as being a close defensive struggle, with the Giants scoring first to take a 7–0 lead. The Eagles actually won easily, 20–7, with the Giants not scoring until late in the game. The fumble recovery depicted in the climactic scene did occur, but Papale's touchdown did not count, under NFL rules at the time, since the ball could not be advanced. It was still a key play in the victory for the Eagles. Papale never scored a regular-season touchdown in the NFL. His only offensive stat came in the 1977 season, where he had 1 catch for 15 yards. However, he scored his first NFL touchdown against the Patriots in a 1977 exhibition game. As with so many of his breaks, this was a big one—the game-winning score. Rookie quarterback Mike Cordova threw from the Pats' 14, and cornerback Raymond Clayborn deflected the ball slightly allowing Papale to make a diving catch in the end zone.

== Filming ==
The preseason/tryout scenes were filmed at Franklin Field at the University of Pennsylvania, and the Central High School Lancers field during July and August 2005. (For 13 seasons, 1958–1970, Franklin Field was the home field of the Eagles.) The crew used their locker room and field. The Lancers, who had a preseason, used Fairmount Park in West Philadelphia during this time. The office scenes were filmed in Delaplaine McDaniel Middle School, during renovations to the school at 1801 Moore Street South Philadelphia. The carnival scenes were filmed at Our Lady of Mount Carmel School in South Philadelphia at 2329 South Third Street. Some of the street scenes were filmed on location in the city. The remainder of the film was filmed in a former aircraft carrier parts warehouse on Langley Avenue in the Philadelphia Naval Business Center. The crew shared this facility with the floats for the Philadelphia Thanksgiving Day Parade. The film opens with Philadelphia native Jim Croce's "I Got a Name".

== Reception ==
=== Box office ===
The film made $17 million in its first weekend and $12.2 million in its second, topping the box office both times.

=== Critical response ===
On the review aggregator website Rotten Tomatoes, 71% of 135 critics' reviews are positive. The website's consensus reads: " As simple and authentic as the gritty South Philly environs in which it's set in, Invincible sends a uplifting and heartfelt message packed with an athletic enthusiasm that shouldn't be missed." Metacritic, which uses a weighted average, assigned the film a score of 63 out of 100, based on 28 critics, indicating "generally favorable" reviews. Audiences polled by CinemaScore gave the film an average grade of "A–" on an A+ to F scale.

Robert Koehler of Variety stated that "while it doesn't reach the level of visceral -- or dramatic -- impact of Friday Night Lights, Invincible generally gets the game's physical nature right, most ironically via Core's choice of slo-mo action shots."

=== In popular culture ===
The film also inspired the show It's Always Sunny in Philadelphia in its third season in an episode called "The Gang Gets Invincible" in which Dennis, Mac and Dee try out for the Philadelphia Eagles due to the movie Invincible; they also repeatedly refer to it as "that New Kids on the Block movie", seemingly confusing lead Mark Wahlberg, and specifically his lead role with Marky Mark and the Funky Bunch, with his brother Donnie Wahlberg.

== Home media ==
The film released on DVD and Blu-ray on December 19, 2006. It re-released on a two-disc Blu-ray set on March 29, 2011.

== See also ==
- The Garbage Picking Field Goal Kicking Philadelphia Phenomenon
- List of American football films
