= Muckinipattis Creek =

Stream in Delaware County, Pennsylvania, US

Coordinates: 39°52′53″N 75°17′18″W

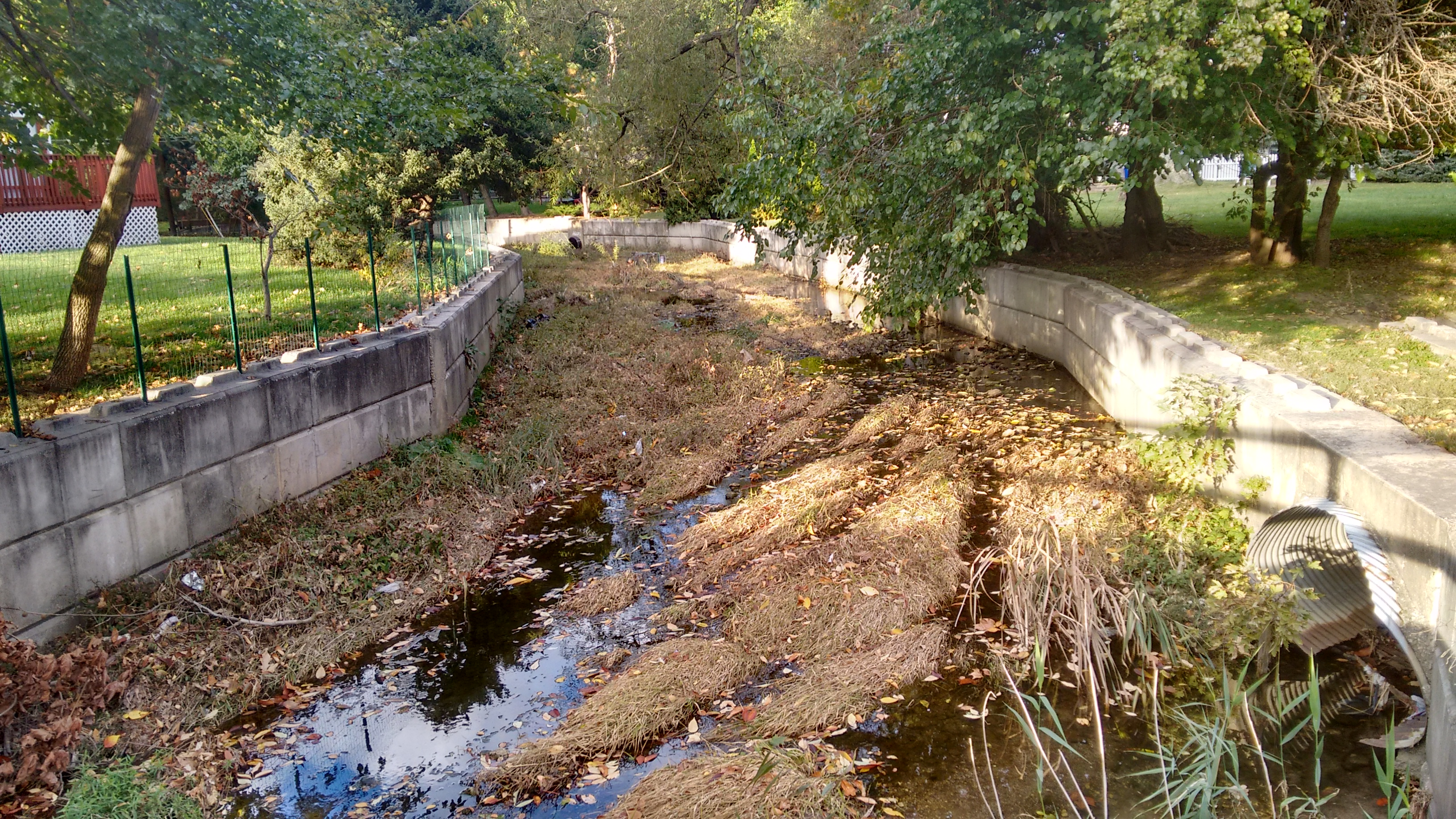
Muckinipattis Creek in Secane, PA

Muckinipattis Creek or Muckinipates (Muckinapates) Creek is a 5.4-mile-long (8.7 km) creek which runs through Delaware County, Pennsylvania and enters Darby Creek just prior to the Delaware River.

The creek is believed to begin with two branches, one in Springfield Township and the other on the southwest corner of Springfield Road and Bishop Avenue. The Muckinipattis then proceeds past the Primos-Secane swim club in Upper Darby Township. Further downstream it flows under the former A&P parking lot in Secane before forming the border of Darby and Ridley townships. It empties into Darby Creek between the shores of Montgomery Park in the borough of Folcroft and the historic Morton Morton House in Norwood.

The name Muckinipates derives from a Lenape word meaning 'deep running water'. The Otter and Turtle tribes within the Lenni Lenape nation lived and hunted along the creek, and had a small village on what today is Montgomery Park in Folcroft.

The Old Mill, or Old Mill Dam (known by locals as 'The Falls'), which today sits at the junction of Delmar Drive in Folcroft, South Avenue in Glenolden, and East Amosland in Norwood was built in 1775 by Thomas Shipley. The gristmill was popular among grain farmers from as far away as Delaware and New Jersey, who would operate barges called "one stickers" up the Muckinipattis to have their goods processed. The mill was at one time owned by John Morton, grandson of Morton Mortensen, and the deciding vote on the Declaration of Independence.

The mill was sold and re-purposed a number of times. It was a bobbin factory when it finally burned down in February 1899.

The confluence of Muckinipattis Creek with Darby Creek is next to the John Heinz National Wildlife Refuge at Tinicum.
