= Ithan Creek =

Stream in Delaware County, Pennsylvania

Ithan Creek Ithan Run
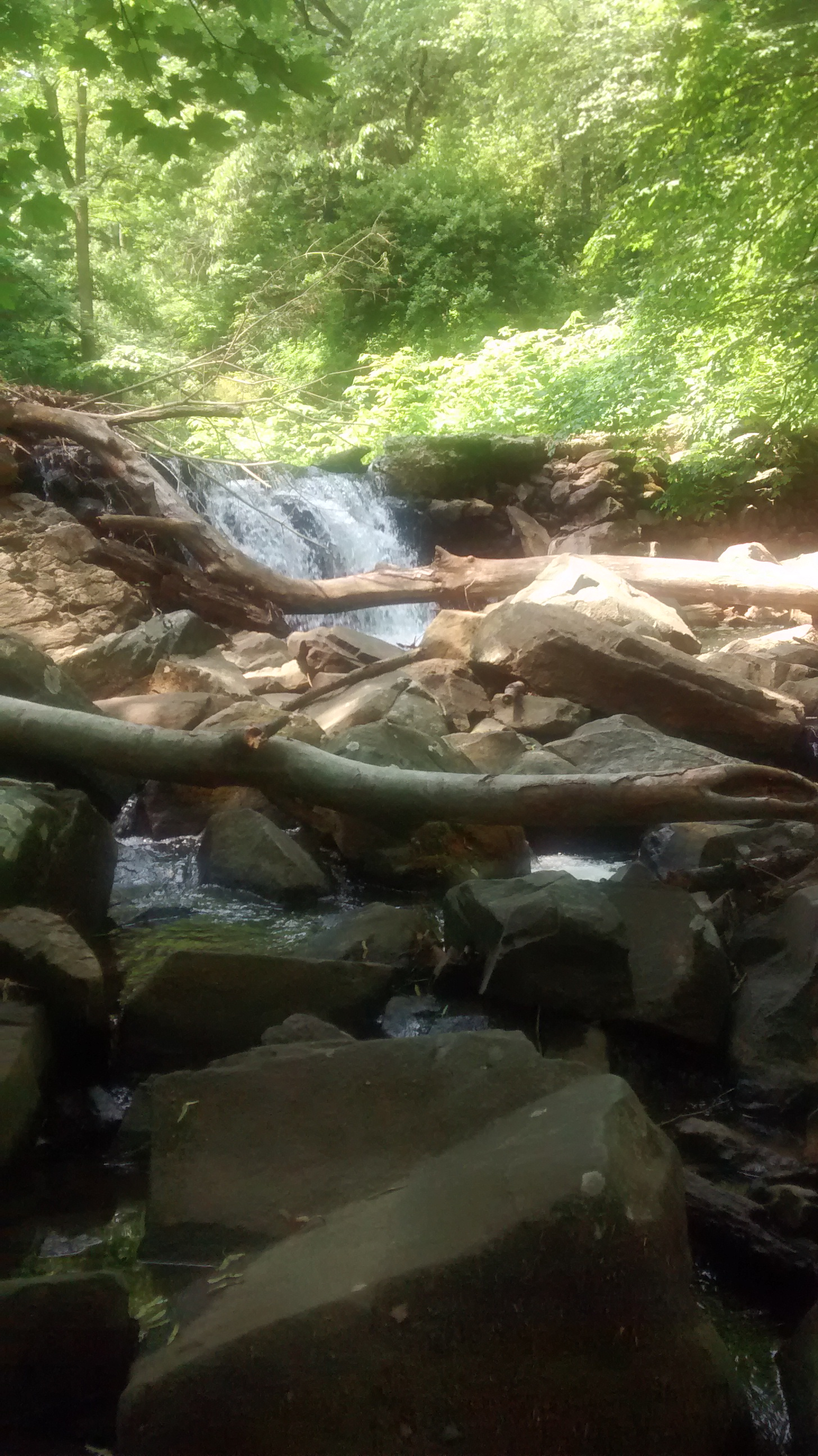
- A waterfall on Ithan Creek in Radnor Township, Pennsylvania

Physical characteristics
- Source
  - location: Radnor Township, Delaware County, Pennsylvania
  - elevation: 399 ft (122 m)
- Mouth
  - location: Darby Creek in Haverford Township, Delaware County, Pennsylvania
  - coordinates: 39°59′49″N 75°21′00″W
  - elevation: 184 ft (56 m)
- Length: 4.2 mi (6.8 km)
- Basin size: 7.39 mi^{2} (19.1 km^{2})

Basin features
- Progression: Darby Creek → Delaware River → Delaware Bay
- Tributaries
  - right: Browns Run, Kirks Run, Meadowbrook Run

Ithan Creek (also known as Ithan Run) is a tributary of Darby Creek in Delaware County, Pennsylvania, in the United States. It is approximately 4.2 miles (6.8 km) long and flows through Radnor Township and Haverford Township. The creek's watershed has an area of 7.39 square miles (19.1 km^{2}) and is highly developed. It has three named tributaries: Browns Run, Kirks Run, and Meadowbrook Run.

The creek was historically the site of several mills and has been subjected to numerous floods over the years. In 1902, a sewage company began dumping raw sewage into the creek, but this practice was stopped in 1905. The creek is in approved trout waters. It is the site of Ithan Valley Park, a small park with hiking and fishing opportunities and the Radnor Valley Country Club.

== Course ==
Ithan Creek rises in a small valley just south of U.S. Route 30 in the community of Wayne, Pennsylvania. It flows west for several tenths of a mile before receiving its first tributary, Browns Run, from the right and turning south. The creek passes under Pennsylvania Route 320 and receives two small unnamed tributaries from the left. It flows alongside Interstate 476 and crosses it once. After a short while, it receives Kirks Run from the right near the community of Rosemont, Pennsylvania. It flows alongside the interstate for several tenths of a mile before passing under it again. Shortly thereafter, Ithan Creek enters Haverford Township, Pennsylvania and receives its largest tributary, Meadowbrook Run. It passes under Darby Road and meets its confluence with Darby Creek.

Ithan Creek joins Darby Creek 17.9 miles (28.8 km) upriver of its mouth.

== Geography and geology ==
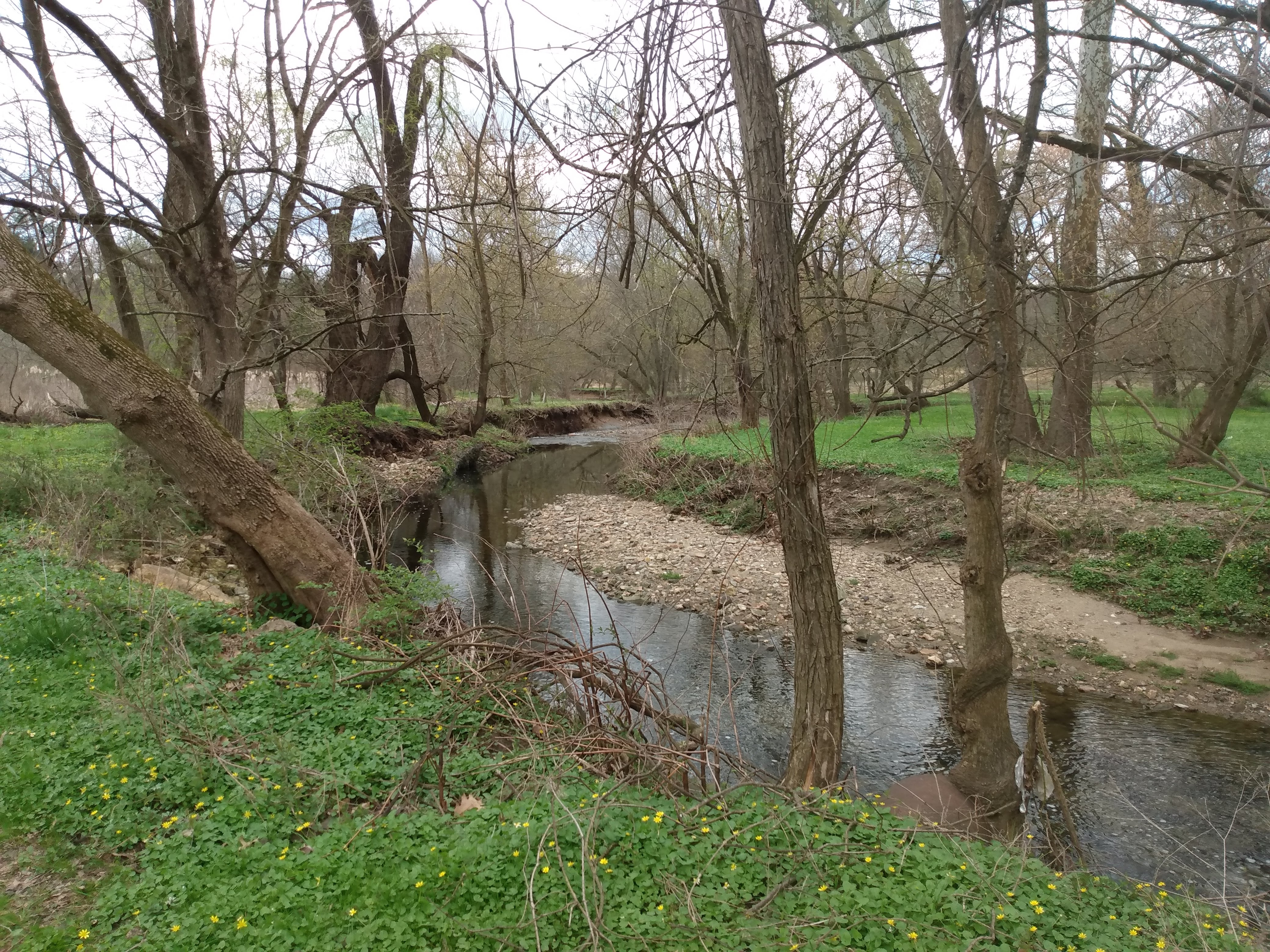
Ithan Creek near its mouth at Darby Creek

The elevation near the mouth of Ithan Creek is 184 feet (56 m) above sea level. The elevation of the creek's source is 399 feet (122 m) above sea level.

Ithan Creek is within the Piedmont Uplands physiographic province. The Piedmont Uplands section has generally old, hard upland rocks that eroded from the Appalachian Mountains. The rocks in the watershed date to the Precambrian Era and Lower Paleozoic Era. The surficial geology mainly consist of felsic gneiss and mafic gneiss formations, with small amounts of serpentinite near the mouth of the creek. Silvery mica schist is exposed along the creek. According to a report by the Geological Society of Pennsylvania, the exposures are rare in the vicinity of Ithan Creek.

Two soil associations exist in the Ithan Creek watershed. The Neshaminy-Lehigh-Glenlg soil association is present in a small part of the watershed. It consists of silty, well drained, gravelly, and deep soil that rests on gabbro and granodiorite bedrock. The Chester-Glenlg-Manor soil association is prevalent through the middle of the watershed. It consists of silty, channery, and shallow to deep soil that rests on brown schist and gneiss bedrock. Most of the watershed is considered to have slightly erodible soil.

== Watershed ==
The watershed of Ithan Creek has an area of 7.39 square miles (19.1 km^{2}). Its source is in the United States Geological Survey quadrangle of Valley Forge, but its mouth is in the quadrangle of Lansdowne. Ithan Creek's watershed has a diversity of land uses, including residential (high density and low density), transportation facilities, offices, college campuses, and historic sites. Its culverts from Sproul Road to Iven Avenue are not sized correctly to manage moderate floods. There are brick structures located alongside the creek that are in poor condition. Major roads in the watershed include Interstate 476, U.S. Route 30, and Pennsylvania Route 320. Ithan Creek is not considered to be impaired.

== History ==
Ithan Creek was entered into the Geographic Names Information System on August 2, 1979. Its identifier in the Geographic Names Information System is 1177888.

The village of Ithan along the creek was the first European settlement in modern-day Radnor Township in the seventeenth century. In 1826, an official report stated the following about mills on the creek:

On Ithan creek in Radnor, a mill seat, on land of the heirs of Andrew Steel, deceased. On Ithan creek, in Radnor, a grist-mill and saw-mill, head and fall about twenty-three feet, owned and occupied by John and David Evans. Near the head of Ithan creek, in Radnor, a grist mill and saw-mill, head and fall about sixteen feet, grinds from eight to ten thousand bushels of grain per annum, and about fifty tons gypsum per annum, saw-mill employed occasionally, owned and occupied by Jesse Brooke.

On August 5, 1843, heavy rains caused massive flooding on Ithan Creek. About a quarter million dollars of damage in property was assessed, and several lives were lost. Bridges on Ithan Creek sustained a damage of about $475.

The Wayne Sewerage Company was incorporated on December 1, 1902 and constructed and maintained sewers in Radnor township. It purchased an eleven-acre tract along the creek to build a sewer system and built an engine house with boilers to purify sewage. After it was purified, the water would be released into Ithan Creek where, the company claimed, it posed no threat to human health. Despite this, on December 4, 1905, the State Board of Health filed a lawsuit against the company alleging raw sewage was being illegally dumped into the creek. As a result, a judge sided with the Board of Health and a new plant was constructed.

Several bridges have been built across Ithan Creek. A concrete tee beam bridge with a length of 27.9 feet (8.5 m) carries Sproul Road over the creek and was built in 1922. A 25.9 feet (7.9 m) bridge of the same type was built in 1930 and carries Conestoga Road over the creek. In 1932, a 40 feet (12 m) concrete arch bridge was constructed that carries Darby Road across Ithan Creek. A concrete slab bridge with a length of 27.9 feet (8.5 m) carries Clyde Road across the creek and was built that same year. Built in 1964, a 27.9 feet (8.5 m) prestressed box beam carries Bryn Mawr Avenue over Ithan Creek. Three years later, two concrete slab bridges were constructed to allow the Mid-County Expressway to cross the creek, both being 29.9 feet (9.1 m) across.

The creek flooded substantially after Tropical Storm Nicole on September 30, 2010. A majority of households surveyed after the storm reported flooding in their basements. As a result, several watershed drainage recommendations were proposed. On August 13, 2018, heavy rains damaged a culvert and some pipes along Ramsey Run, a tributary of Ithan Creek. Several houses were flooded as Pennsylvania Route 320 become a flowing stream. A sink hole also opened next to the culvert. In May 2019, state government agencies repaired the culvert and pipes.

== Biology ==
The creek is approved trout waters. Brown trout have been recorded to naturally reproduce in the creek. On the banks of the stream, populations of white-tailed deer are overabundant.

The Ithan-Darby Creek Wetlands is listed on the Delaware County Natural Areas Inventory. It is a "notable significance" site. At the floodplain at the confluence of Ithan Creek and Darby Creek, the main trees species include silver maple, black willow, boxelder, and red maple. In the wetlands at this site, the main tree species include scattered black willow and silver maple. There are also patches of silky dogwood and wild rose, which are surrounded by assorted wetland plants such as herbs, grasses, sedges, and rushes. Monkeyflower, ironweed, joe-pye weed, and mountain mint can sometimes be seen in the wetland, and a variety of invasive species are a concern. Most of the original forest cover has been removed to allow for farming and residential development.

== Recreation ==
Ithan Valley Park is a 19-acre park that is adjacent to the creek. It contains a hiking trail and has fishing opportunities. The construction of a “Willowstreams corridor” trail is actively underway next to the creek that will connect Haverford Reserve to Ithan Valley Park when completed. Radnor Valley Country Club is a golf course that borders the creek. Formerly crossing the creek, it was redesigned in 1968 to run north-south along the creek due to construction of Interstate 476.

== See also ==
- List of Pennsylvania rivers
