= State Route 2005 (Delaware County, Pennsylvania) =

Highway in Delaware County, Pennsylvania

State Route 2005

- Map of Delaware County in southeastern Pennsylvania with SR 2005 highlighted in red

Route information
- Maintained by PennDOT
- Length: 9.3 mi (15.0 km)
- Existed: 1987–present

Major junctions
- West end: PA 320 in Haverford Township
- PA 3 in Haverford Township; US 1 in Upper Darby Township; US 13 in Darby
- East end: SR 3023 in Darby

Location
- Country: United States
- State: Pennsylvania
- Counties: Delaware

Highway system
- Pennsylvania State Route System; Interstate; US; State; Scenic; Legislative

State Route 2005 is a major 9.3 mile (15 km) long road, running in a southeast–northwest direction in Delaware County, Pennsylvania. The western terminus is at Pennsylvania Route 320 in Haverford Township, Pennsylvania. Its eastern terminus is at a Cobbs Creek bridge in Darby, Pennsylvania. Past this bridge is State Route 3023, which continues into Philadelphia. SR 2005 is known as Darby Road in Haverford Township, Lansdowne Avenue from U.S. Route 1 to Darby, and Main Street in Darby.

== Route description ==
=== Darby Road ===
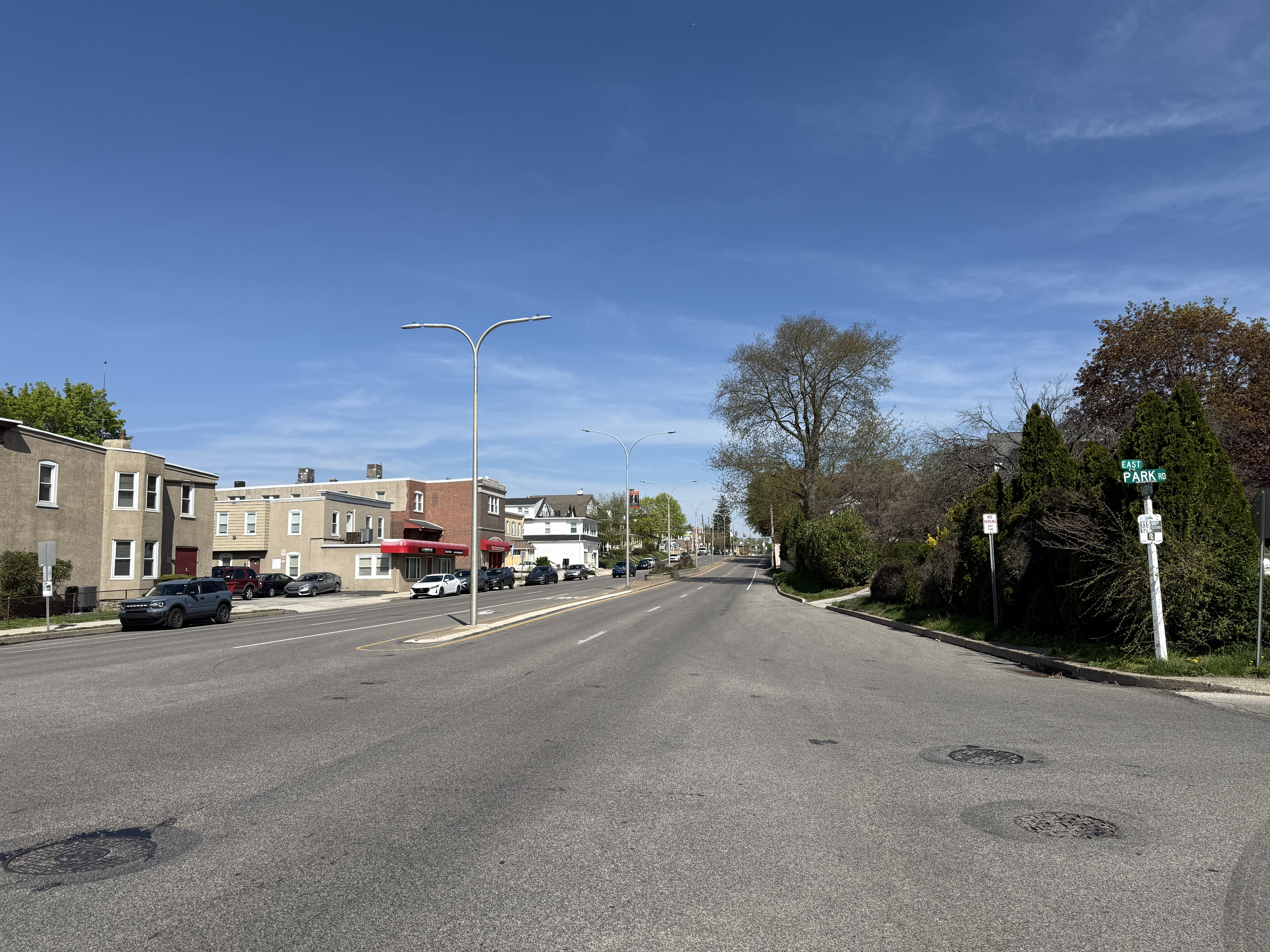
SR 2005 (Darby Road) westbound past PA 3 in Havertown

SR 2005 begins at an intersection between two forks of Darby Road and Sproul Road (Pennsylvania Route 320) in Haverford Township, Pennsylvania. Immediately after its western terminus, the two forks join and proceed almost due east into woodland with some residential development. The area is generally referred to as Bryn Mawr, Pennsylvania due to sharing a common ZIP code (19010) with the community; however, Bryn Mawr's census-designated place (CDP) is located wholly within Lower Merion Township. SR 2005 intersects side street Brennan Drive before crossing Ithan Creek shortly upstream from its mouth at Darby Creek. Carrying 9002 vehicles a day, the bridge is listed as functionally obsolete by the National Bridge Inventory (NBI). In evaluating the structural sufficiency of the bridge, the NBI stated that it is "somewhat better than minimum adequacy to tolerate being left in place as is," estimating the improvement cost to be $99,000.

Past the bridge, Darby Road becomes the border between Zip Code 19010 and Haverford, Pennsylvania, an unincorporated community defined by its Zip Code, 19041. SR 2005 then passes under Interstate 476 (Mid-County Expressway) but does not interchange. At the intersection with Radnor Road, the border between the two Zip Codes ends and Darby Road passes completely within Haverford.

== History ==
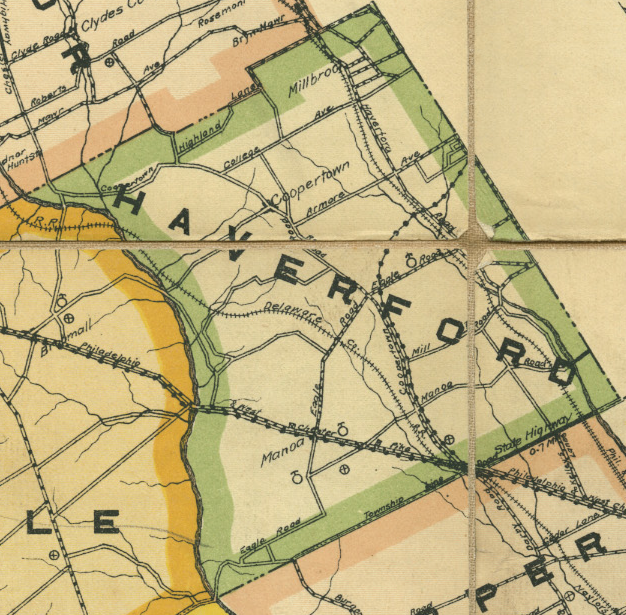
Map of Haverford Township from 1913, showing Darby Road as Coopertown Road

The road that provides access to Darby from Bryn Mawr was formed in 1687. Originally it was known as Darby Road in its entirety, but later on the section near the old cooperage in Bryn Mawr was renamed Coopertown Road. Today only the portion in Haverford Township is known as Darby Road.

With the promulgation of the Sproul Road Bill on May 31, 1911, Pennsylvania began controlling and numbering state highways. Included in the bill was Legislative Route 180, which ran from the Delaware state line into Philadelphia. It was assigned to the portion of the historic Darby Road from MacDade Boulevard to its terminus at a Cobbs Creek bridge that had been built two years beforehand. In 1926, when the U.S. Highway system was formed, U.S. Route 13 absorbed LR 180 as a section of its routing.

Around this time, roadwork was in progress for a portion of the historic Darby Road not covered by U.S. 13. In existence as a covered bridge since 1687, the bridge over Ithan Creek near Darby Road's western terminus was remodeled in 1932. It was turned into a conventional arch bride, removing the covering.

By 1940, U.S. Route 13 was routed along its current alignment, to follow MacDade Boulevard north past Main Street instead of joining it at the intersection. U.S. Route 13 Bypass was also created by that year, splitting from U.S. 13 at the aforementioned intersection and heading northbound along Main Street and Lansdowne Avenue until what is now U.S. Route 1 (Township Line Road). Here, it followed Township Line Road and later City Avenue into Philadelphia. Township Line Road and City Avenue were signed as U.S. Route 1 Bypass, while the mainstem U.S. Route 1 followed Baltimore Pike into Philadelphia. U.S. Route 13 Bypass was deleted in 1967.

In 1987, a Location Referencing System (LRS) was established to define roadways that the Pennsylvania Department of Transportation deemed important. The system added the concept of a quadrant route, a road given a uniform four digit number between 1000 and 4000 that was unique per county. Quadrant routes would only be signed in little white markers placed at major intersections. With the creation of the LRS; the historic Darby Road was assigned the number of 2005.

== Major intersections ==
The entire route is in Delaware County.

Location	mi	km	Destinations	Notes
Haverford Township	0.0	0.0	PA 320 (Sproul Road)	Western terminus of SR 2005
Haverford Township	1.5	2.4	SR 1026 (College Avenue)	Western terminus of SR 1026
Haverford Township	1.9	3.1	SR 1028 (Marple Road)	Eastern terminus of SR 1028
Haverford Township	2.0	3.2	SR 1007 (Coopertown Road)	Southern terminus of SR 1007
Haverford Township	2.1	3.4	SR 1018 (Ardmore Avenue)	
Haverford Township	2.9	4.7	SR 1005 (Eagle Road)	Formerly PA 105
Haverford Township	3.1	5.0	SR 1011 (East Darby Road) to SR 1005 (Eagle Road)	Southern terminus of SR 1011
Haverford Township	3.7	6.0	SR 1050 (Brookline Boulevard)	Western terminus of SR 1050
Haverford Township	3.8	6.1	SR 1002 (Manoa Road)	
Haverford Township	4.4	7.1	PA 3 (West Chester Pike)	
Upper Darby Township	4.5	7.2	US 1 (Township Line Road) – Philadelphia, Media	Township line
Upper Darby Township	5.3	8.5	SR 2026 (State Road)	
Upper Darby Township	5.9	9.5	SR 2019 (Garrett Road)	
Lansdowne	6.2	10.0	SR 2024 (Marshall Road)	Borough line
Lansdowne	6.7	10.8	SR 2022 (Stewart Avenue)	Western terminus of SR 2022
Lansdowne	7.0	11.3	SR 2016 (Baltimore Pike)	Formerly PA 12
Yeadon	7.5	12.1	SR 2010 (Providence Road)	Eastern terminus of SR 2010
Darby	8.2	13.2	US 13 (Macdade Boulevard)	
Darby	9.3	15.0	SR 3023 (Woodland Avenue)	Continuation into Philadelphia
1.000 mi = 1.609 km; 1.000 km = 0.621 mi
