= Meadowbrook Run =

River in Pennsylvania, United States

Coordinates: 40°00′05″N 75°21′06″W

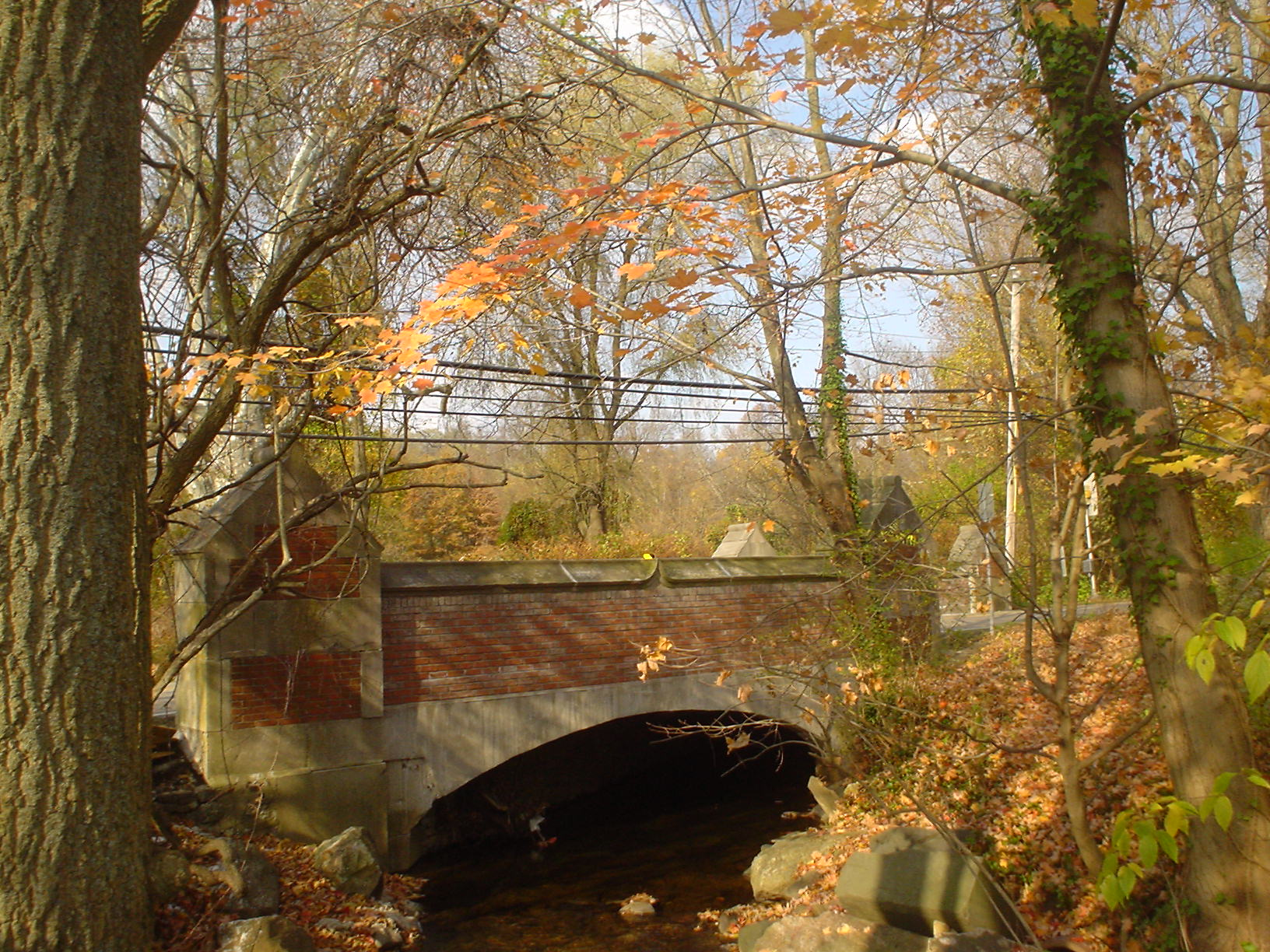
Meadowbrook Run in November 2009

Meadowbrook Run (also known as Meadow Brook Creek) is a tributary of Ithan Creek in Delaware County, Pennsylvania, in the United States. It is approximately 1.9 miles (3.1 km) long and flows through Radnor Township and Haverford Township.

== Course ==
Meadowbrook Run begins just south of Conestoga Road near the community of Bryn Mawr, Pennsylvania. It flows southwest for several tenths of a mile before receiving its first tributary, Finn Run, from the left. Shortly thereafter, it begins to parallel Bryn Mawr Avenue and flows into a small pond where it receives Valley Run from the right. Several hundred feet later, it receives Doom Run from the left. Meadowbrook Run then passes under Bryn Mawr Avenue and meets with a small unnamed tributary. The creek flows into Haverford Township, passes under Interstate 476, and reaches its confluence with Ithan Creek.

Meadowbrook Run joins Ithan Creek 0.30 miles (0.48 km) upriver of its mouth.

== Geography and geology ==
The elevation near the mouth of Meadowbrook Run is 200 feet (61 m) above sea level. The elevation of the creek's source is between 340 and 350 feet (100 and 110 m) above sea level.

== Watershed ==
The watershed of Meadowbrook Run has an area of 2.37 square miles (6.1 km^{2}). The entire creek is in the United States Geological Survey quadrangle of Norristown. The watershed has several different land uses, including urban residential, retail, college campus (Villanova University), and rural or low density residential. Meadowbrook Run periodically floods during large storm events. The stream is not considered to be impaired.

== History ==
Meadowbrook Run was entered into the Geographic Names Information System on August 2, 1979. Its identifier in the Geographic Names Information System is 1180837.

The Bridge in Radnor Township No. 2 is a brick and concrete arch bridge that spans Meadowbrook Run. It was built in 1905 and has a length of 75-foot-long (23 m). The bridge is on the National Register of Historic Places.

In 1986, a development was built on the Willing tract in the Meadowbrook Run watershed. It received local opposition due to the potential of flooding in Meadowbrook Run. However, engineer Theodore J. Gacomis said there would be no runoff problems due to the construction of a retention basin that would release water into the stream at a controlled rate.

== See also ==
- List of Pennsylvania rivers
