= Silky dogwood =

Silky dogwood is a common name for two species of shrubs, formerly treated as a single species:

- Cornus amomum, a more southerly species found in the eastern U.S.
- Cornus obliqua, a more northerly species found in the eastern U.S. and Canada
