= Darby Creek (Pennsylvania) =

Creek in Pennsylvania, USA

Darby Creek Church Creek, Derby River
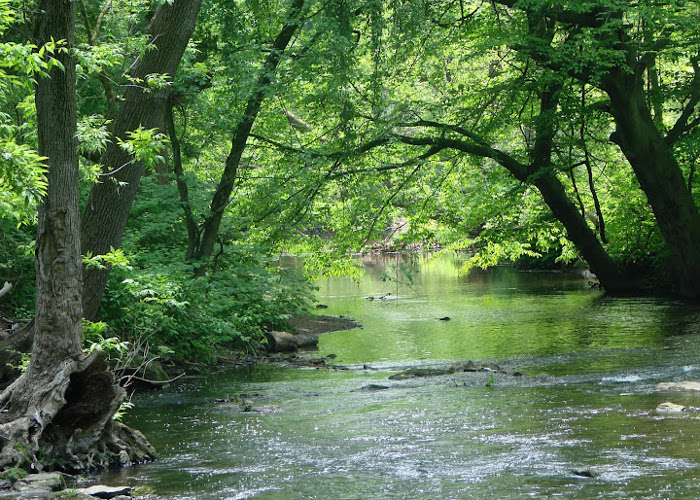
- Darby Creek in Haverford Township, Pennsylvania

Physical characteristics
- Source
  - location: small valley in Tredyffrin Township, Pennsylvania
  - coordinates: 40°02′23″N 75°27′39″W
  - elevation: between 420 and 440 feet (130 and 130 m)
- Mouth
  - location: Delaware River in Delaware County, Pennsylvania
  - coordinates: 39°51′40″N 75°18′50″W
  - elevation: 0 ft (0 m)
- Length: 26 mi (42 km)
- Basin size: 77.2 mi^{2} (200 km^{2})
- Discharge
  - average: 10 to 17 cubic feet per second (0.28 to 0.48 m^{3}/s) (two measurements) (at Foxcroft)

Basin features
- Progression: Delaware River → Delaware Bay
- Tributaries
  - left: Little Darby Creek, Miles Run, Ithan Creek, Longford Run, Colleen Brook, Cobbs Creek
  - right: Thomas Run, Camp Run, Lewis Run, Hermesprota Creek, Muckinipattis Creek, Stony Creek

Darby Creek is a tributary of the Delaware River in Chester, Delaware and Philadelphia counties, in the U.S. Commonwealth of Pennsylvania. It is approximately 26 miles (42 km) long. The watershed of the creek has an area of 77.2 square miles (200 km^{2}). It has twelve named direct tributaries, including Cobbs Creek, Little Darby Creek, Ithan Creek, and Muckinipattis Creek. The creek has a low level of water quality for most of its length. The lower Darby Creek area was deemed a Superfund site by the U.S. Environmental Protection Agency (EPA) due to contamination with dangerous chemicals from two landfills.

Darby Creek flows through a narrow valley in its upper reaches and a tidal flat in its lower reaches. The creek is in the Piedmont Uplands and Atlantic Coastal Plain physiographic provinces. Major rock formations in the watershed include the Wissahickon Formation. Three small dams historically existed on the creek, but were removed in 2012. The watershed of the creek is largely developed, with roughly half a million people inhabiting it. Most of the watershed is in Delaware County, but some parts are in Chester County, Philadelphia County, and Montgomery County. The watershed is part of the Lower Delaware drainage basin.

Historically, the Lenni Lenape people inhabited the area in the vicinity of Darby Creek. By the 17th century, the Dutch and Swedish had arrived in the area, followed some years later by the English. Numerous mills of various types were eventually built along the creek and several railroads traversed the watershed. In modern times, grants by various organizations have been awarded to improve the creek and its watershed. The Darby Creek Valley Association operates within the watershed. Part of the creek's length is designated as a Coldwater Fishery and a Migratory Fishery, part is a Trout Stocked Fishery and a Migratory Fishery. Various species of fish, including redbreast sunfish, eels, and trout, inhabit it. Several areas in the vicinity of the creek are listed on the Delaware County Natural Areas Inventory. These include the Darby Creek Mouth Mudflat, the John Heinz National Wildlife Refuge, and the Ithan-Darby Creek Wetlands. A reach of the creek is navigable by canoe.

== Course ==
Darby Creek begins in a small valley near US Route 30 in Tredyffrin Township, Chester County. It flows south-southeast for more than a mile before entering Easttown Township and turning east-northeast for several tenths of a mile. The creek then turns southeast for a few miles, passing through Newtown Township, Delaware County and entering Radnor Township, where it receives its first two named tributaries, Thomas Run and Little Darby Creek, from the right and left, respectively. The creek then turns south-southeast for several tenths of a mile before turning southeast for several more miles. In this reach, it receives the tributary Miles Run from the left and the tributary Camp Run from the right. The creek eventually turns east briefly before receiving the tributary Ithan Creek from the left and turning south-southeast for several miles along the border between Marple Township and Haverford Township. In this reach, the creek flows alongside Interstate 476 and crosses it once. As it continues downstream alongside the highway, it crosses Pennsylvania Route 3 and receives the tributary Langford Run from the left. Near Pilgrim Gardens, it turns southeast again and begins to flow along the border between Upper Darby Township and Springfield Township, crossing US Route 1 and receiving the tributaries Colleen Brook and Lewis Run from the left and right, respectively. Further downstream, the creek's valley becomes much steeper and narrower and it makes several meanders as it passes by Clifton Heights and Lansdowne before flowing along the border between Aldan and Yeadon. The creek then flows south-southeast for a few miles, leaving its valley and passing Darby, Collingdale, Sharon Hill, and Colwyn as it crosses US Route 13. It then receives the tributary Cobbs Creek from the left.

The creek turns south and enters the John Heinz National Wildlife Refuge 4.5 miles upstream from its mouth. At this point it passes through the largest freshwater marsh in Pennsylvania before becoming entirely tidal. It turns west-southwest for a few miles, passing by Philadelphia, Folcroft, Norwood, Prospect Park, Tinicum Township, and Ridley Township and receives the tributary Muckinipattis Creek from the right. Darby Creek winds through a large lagoon 30 ft deep in places that was dredged in the 1960s. The creek then receives Stony Creek, its last named tributary, from the right and turns south for a few tenths of a mile before reaching its confluence with the Delaware River.

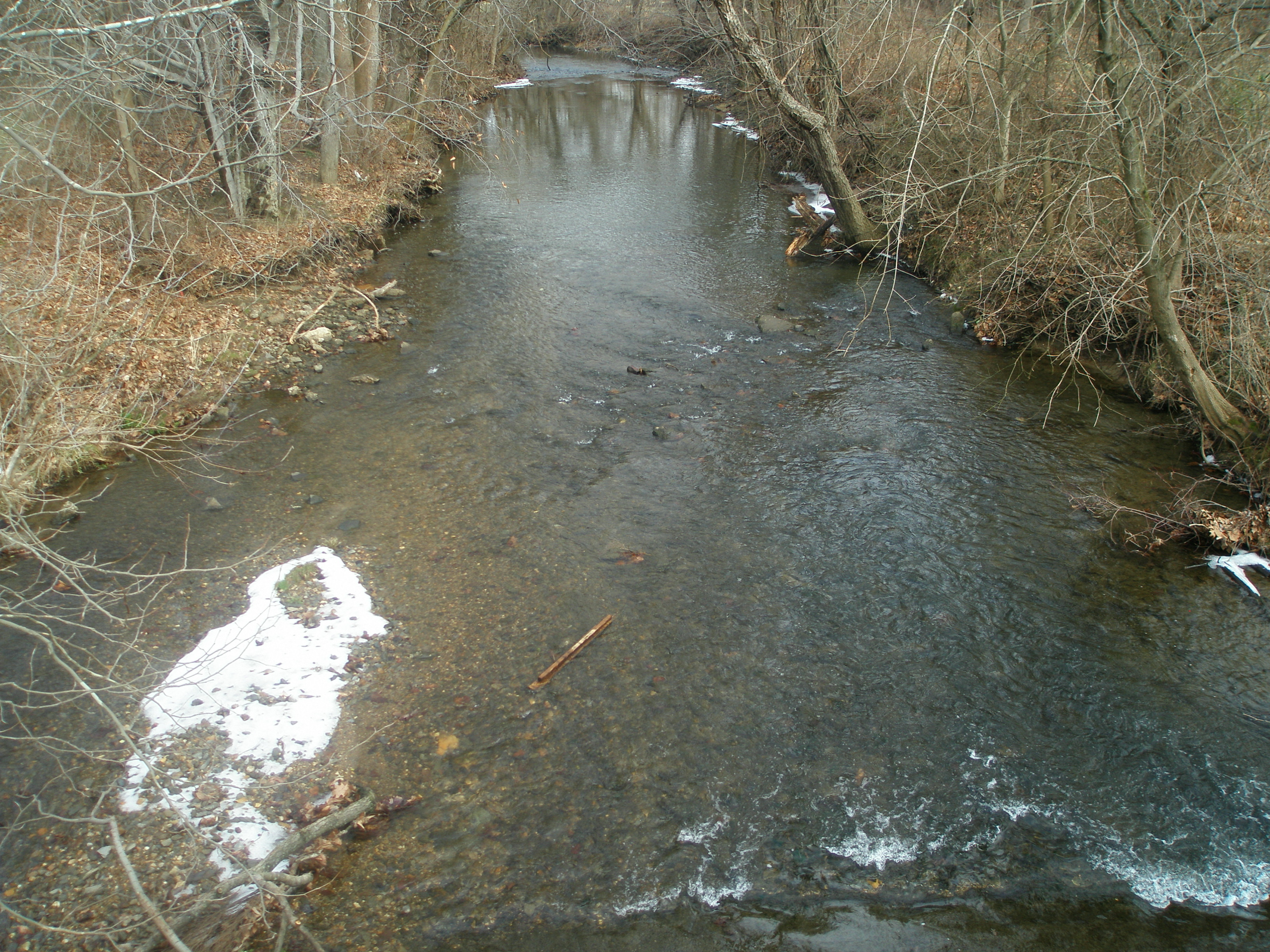
Darby Creek in Marple Township

Darby Creek joins the Delaware River 85.28 miles (137.24 km) upriver of its mouth.

=== Tributaries ===
Tributaries of Darby Creek include Cobbs Creek, Little Darby Creek, Ithan Creek, Muckinipattis Creek, and numerous others. Muckinipattis Creek joins Darby Creek 2.50 miles (4.02 km) upstream of its mouth and its watershed has an area of 4.29 square miles (11.1 km^{2}). Cobbs Creek joins Darby Creek 6.20 miles (9.98 km) upstream of its mouth and its watershed has an area of 22.3 square miles (58 km^{2}). Ithan Creek joins Darby Creek 17.90 miles (28.81 km) upstream of its mouth and its watershed has an area of 7.39 square miles (19.1 km^{2}). Little Darby Creek joins Darby Creek 20.80 miles (33.47 km) upstream of its mouth and its watershed has an area of 3.61 square miles (9.3 km^{2}).

== Hydrology ==
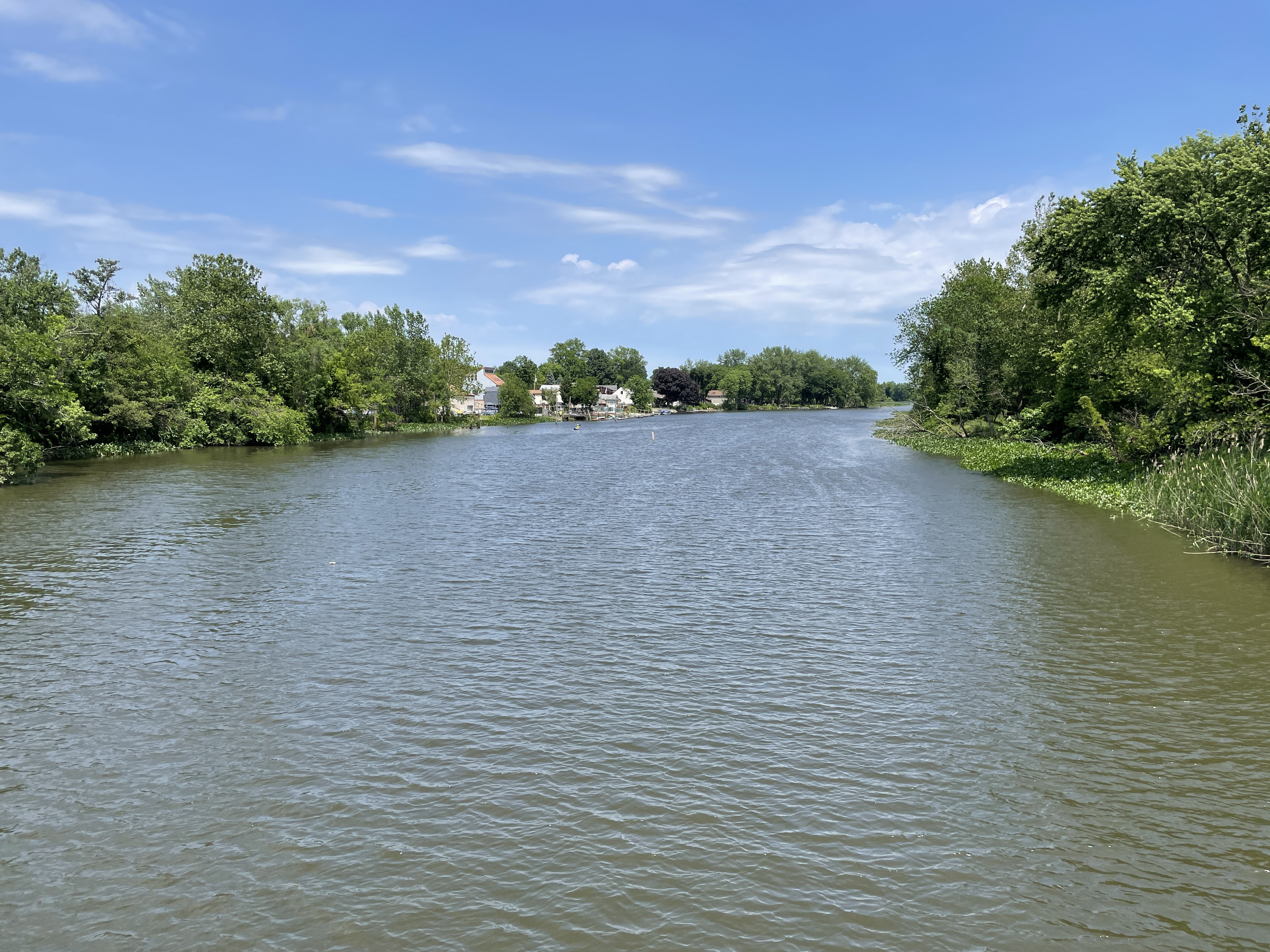
Darby Creek in Prospect Park

For most of its length, Darby Creek has a low level of water quality. However, in some reaches of the watershed, especially the upper reaches, the streams in the watershed have a medium-low or even medium-high level of water quality. A Superfund site known as the Lower Darby Creek Superfund Site contaminates Darby Creek and impacts the creek's water quality. The creek is considered to be impaired for its lower 10.9 miles (17.5 km). The causes of the impairment are habitat modification, siltation, and flow variability stemming from urban runoff and storm sewers.

Two measures of the instantaneous discharge of Darby Creek at Foxcroft in the 2000s were 10 and 17 cubic feet per second. The specific conductance of the creek ranged from 274 to 313 micro-siemens per centimeter. The pH was slightly alkaline, ranging from 7.3 to 7.8. The concentration of water hardness in the creek ranged between 100 and 109 milligrams per liter.

The concentration of dissolved oxygen in Darby Creek was measured to range from 7.4 to 12.4 milligrams per liter. The carbon dioxide concentration ranged from 1.9 to 3.4 milligrams per liter and the nitrogen concentration range from 2.1 to 2.2 milligrams per liter. The concentration of organic nitrogen ranged between < 0.19 and 0.25 milligrams per liter and the concentration of organic carbon ranged from 2.1 t to 2.2 milligrams per liter. The concentration of ammonia in filtered water was less than or equal to 0.02 milligrams per liter in two measurements and the nitrate concentration was half that in two measurements. The orthophosphate concentration in filtered water ranged from < 0.031 to 0.071 milligrams per liter and the phosphorus concentration in unfiltered water ranged from 0.032 to 0.045 milligrams per liter.

The concentration of magnesium in Darby Creek ranged from 10.7 to 11.7 milligrams per liter in filtered water and the concentration of calcium ranged from 22.5 to 24.6 milligrams per liter. The sodium concentration ranged between 11.1 and 13.0 milligrams per liter and the potassium concentration ranged between 2.15 and 2.80 milligrams per liter. The manganese concentration ranges from 10.6 to 25.6 milligrams per liter and the iron concentration ranges from 18.9 to 60.7 milligrams per liter. The boron concentration ranges from an estimated 12 to 16 milligrams per liter.

The concentration of fluoride in Darby Creek is less than 0.01 milligrams per liter and the chloride concentration ranges from 26.2 to 33.6 milligrams per liter. The sulfate concentration ranges between 18.1 and 19.9 milligrams per liter. The silica concentration was twice measured to be 15.7 milligrams per liter.

== Geography, geology, and climate ==
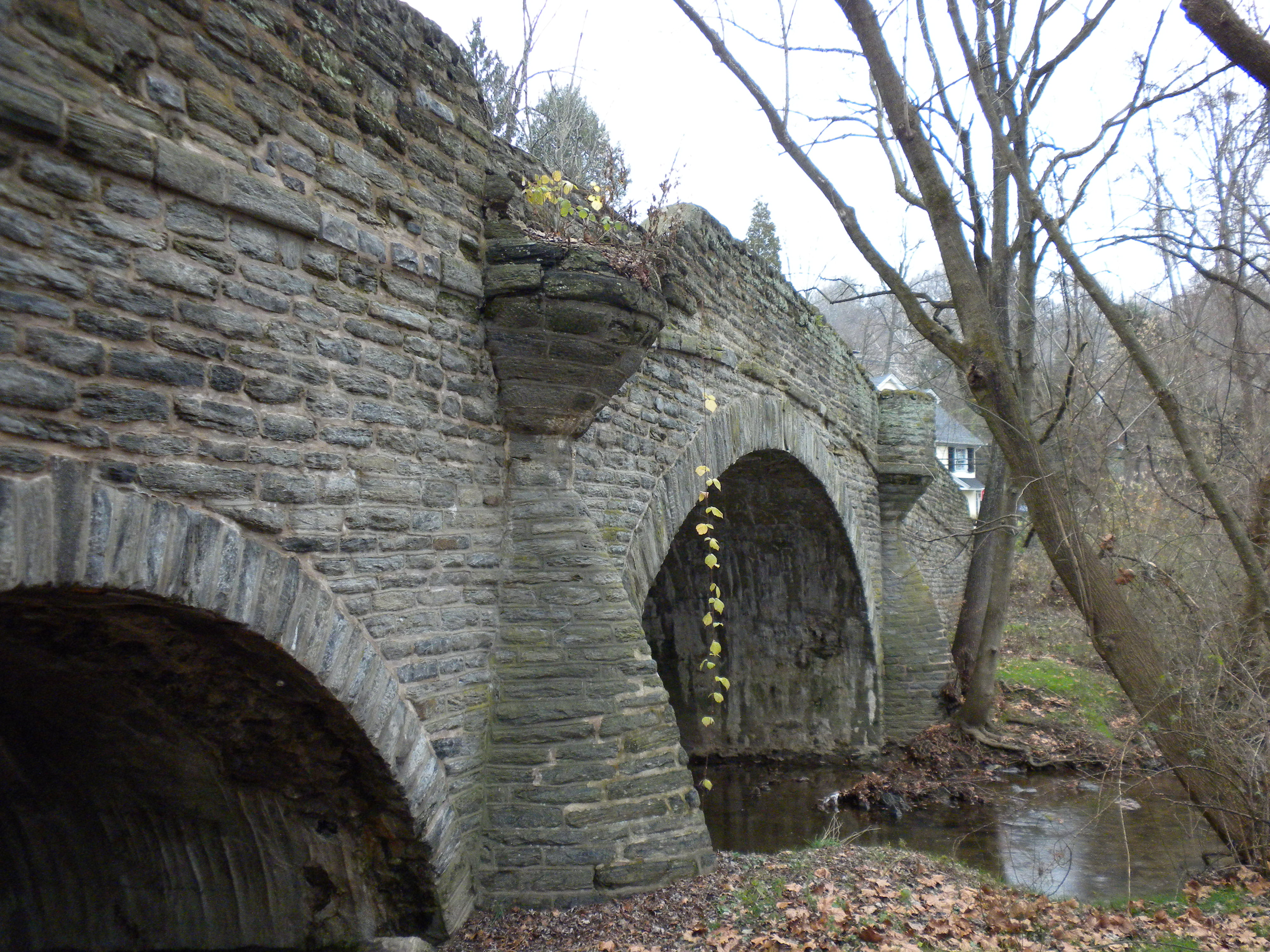
A bridge over Darby Creek in Radnor Township

The elevation near the mouth of Darby Creek is 0 feet (0 m) above sea level. The elevation of the creek's source is between 420 and 440 feet (130 and 130 m) above sea level. The gradient of the creek for its first 5.5 miles (8.9 km) is 36.4 feet (11.1 m) per 1 mile (1.6 km). For the next 10 miles (16 km), the gradient of the creek is 18 feet (5.5 m) per 1 mile (1.6 km). For the last 8.5 miles (13.7 km), the gradient is only a few feet per mile.

The valley of Darby Creek is considerably narrower in its upper reaches, but widens out as it approaches the Delaware River. Numerous reaches of the creek have been armored with boulders or riprap. Upstream of the tributary Cobbs Creek, the stream's channel is sinuous and the creek flows through a narrow valley bordered by low, steep hills. From Cobbs Creek downstream to its mouth, the creek is in a tidal flat.

The northern section of Darby Creek is within the Piedmont Uplands physiographic province, while the southern section is part of the Atlantic Coastal Plain province. The Piedmont Uplands section has generally old, hard upland rocks that eroded from the Appalachian Mountains. The rocks from the northern portion of the watershed date to the Precambrian Era and Lower Paleozoic Era. The rocks from the southern portion of the watershed are newer, dating from the Tertiary and Quaternary Periods. Atlantic Coastal Plain rock is generally softer than Piedmont Uplands rock and was deposited in the area about 1.6 million years ago through glacial erosion.

Several geologic formations can be found within watershed of Darby Creek. The Wissahickon Formation is the most prevalent formation in the watershed. It is derived from derived from sandstones and mudstones and is composed of mica schist. Metamorphic felsic gneiss and mafic gneiss formations are common in the northern parts of the watershed. The Bryn Mawr Formation and the Bridgeton Formation are also present and are unconsolidated deposits of rock that rest on top of the dense crystalline bedrock. Mica slate is present in Marple Township and was manufactured to form "Darby Creek scythe stones" in the 1860s.

Darby Creek tends to be a fast stream with some riffles. There is also whitewater in places. The creek is a "radically intermittent storm drain" in its upper reaches and a tidal estuary in its lower reaches. It passes through the only substantial tidal wetlands in Pennsylvania.

There used to be three small dams on Darby Creek. Going downstream, their heights were 8 feet (2.4 m), 6 feet (1.8 m), and 4 feet (1.2 m). However, they were removed in late 2012 because they were contributing to flooding in the area and blocking fish passage.

During several measurements in the 2000s, the water temperature of Darby Creek at Foxcroft ranged from 14.4 to 20.2 °C (57.9 to 68.4 °F). The air temperature in the area ranged from 19.7 to 24.0 °C (67.5 to 75.2 °F). The barometric pressures range from 759 to 762 mm Hg. The average annual rate of precipitation in the watershed of Darby Creek is between 45 and 50 inches (110 and 130 cm).

=== Soil ===
Three soil associations exist in the Darby Creek watershed. The Neshaminy-Lehigh-Glenlg soil association is prevalent in the northwest part of the watershed. It consists of silty, well drained, gravelly, and deep soil that rests on gabbro and granodiorite bedrock. The Chester-Glenlg-Manor soil association is prevalent throughout the watershed except in its lower reaches. It consists of silty, channery, and shallow to deep soil that rests on brown schist and gneiss bedrock. The Urban Land-Wetbrook-Pitts soil association is prevalent in the southern part of the watershed. It consists of silty, sandy, and deep soil that rests on coastal sediments. Roughly 53% of the land in the Darby Creek watershed is classified as having slightly erodible soil.

== Watershed ==
The watershed of Darby Creek has an area of 77.2 square miles (200 km^{2}). A total of 6.5 square miles (17 km^{2}) are in Chester County, 4.2 square miles (11 km^{2}) are in Montgomery County, 60 square miles (160 km^{2}) are in Delaware County, and 6.5 square miles (17 km^{2}) are in Philadelphia. Darby Creek's watershed is often referred to as the "Darby-Cobbs watershed" since its largest tributary, Cobbs Creek, drains a total area of 22.2 square miles (57 km^{2}), or approximately one third of the Darby Creek watershed. The watershed is part of the Lower Delaware drainage basin. Neighboring major watersheds are Crum Creek to the west and the Schuylkill River to the east. The creek serves as the county line between Delaware County and Philadelphia County for a reach of 2 miles (3.2 km). The creek's mouth is situated in the United States Geological Survey quadrangle of Bridgeport; however, its source located is in the quadrangle of Valley Forge. The creek also passes through the quadrangles of Lansdowne and Norristown. There are 31 municipalities in the watershed, of which 26 are in Delaware County.

A large part of the watershed of Darby Creek is located on developed land, with many suburbs of Philadelphia are in the watershed. The majority (61%) of the land use is considered residential, while 11% is undeveloped and 10% is open space. Of the remaining land, most of it is considered industrial, commercial, and institutional, with 2.45% classified as paved. Estimates for the population of the watershed range from 484,000 to 500,000. In general, the topography of the watershed consists of rolling land that is densely settled. A large undeveloped tract of land owned by the Delaware County Industrial Development Authority is located at the mouth of the creek.

The developed nature of the watershed of Darby Creek has caused it to be prone to storm surges during rains. Substantial amounts of nonpoint source pollution flows into the creek during storm events. Additionally, much of the older development in the watershed was built before current environmental regulations were enacted. In 2012, an article in The Philadelphia Inquirer stated that Darby Creek "is one of the country's most flood-prone streams, a significant drain on the National Flood Insurance Program, and a national lesson in what can go wrong along a developed waterway." A Superfund site known as the Lower Darby Creek Area site is located in the vicinity of the creek. This site consists of two landfills. Major roads in the watershed include Interstate 95 and Interstate 476.

== History and name ==
Darby Creek was entered into the Geographic Names Information System on August 2, 1979. Its identifier in the Geographic Names Information System is 1172928. According to the Geographic Names Information System, variant names include Church Creek and Derby River.

=== Before 1900 ===
The Lenni Lenape tribe was the first Native American tribe to inhabit the area in the vicinity of Darby Creek. They fished, hunted, and used the creek for transportation via canoe. At the time, the area was forested, so they burned clearings in the forest in order to farm and for security purposes. The Lenape named the creek "Muckruton", which appeared on several early maps.

The first Europeans to come to the area in the vicinity of Darby Creek were the Dutch, though they did not establish any permanent settlements. In 1643, Swedish colonists led by Johan Printz established New Sweden near the confluence of Darby Creek and the Delaware River. The settlement they established served as the seat of government for the Swedes in North America for 12 years. They may have built impoundments in the creek to isolate marsh areas. Dutch settlers conquered the Swedish villages in 1655. In 1664, the Dutch surrendered the Darby Creek drainage basin to the English, who began settling the area after William Penn was issued a charter in 1681. The Darby Creek Ferry House, near the site of Printz's headquarters, was erected in 1694.

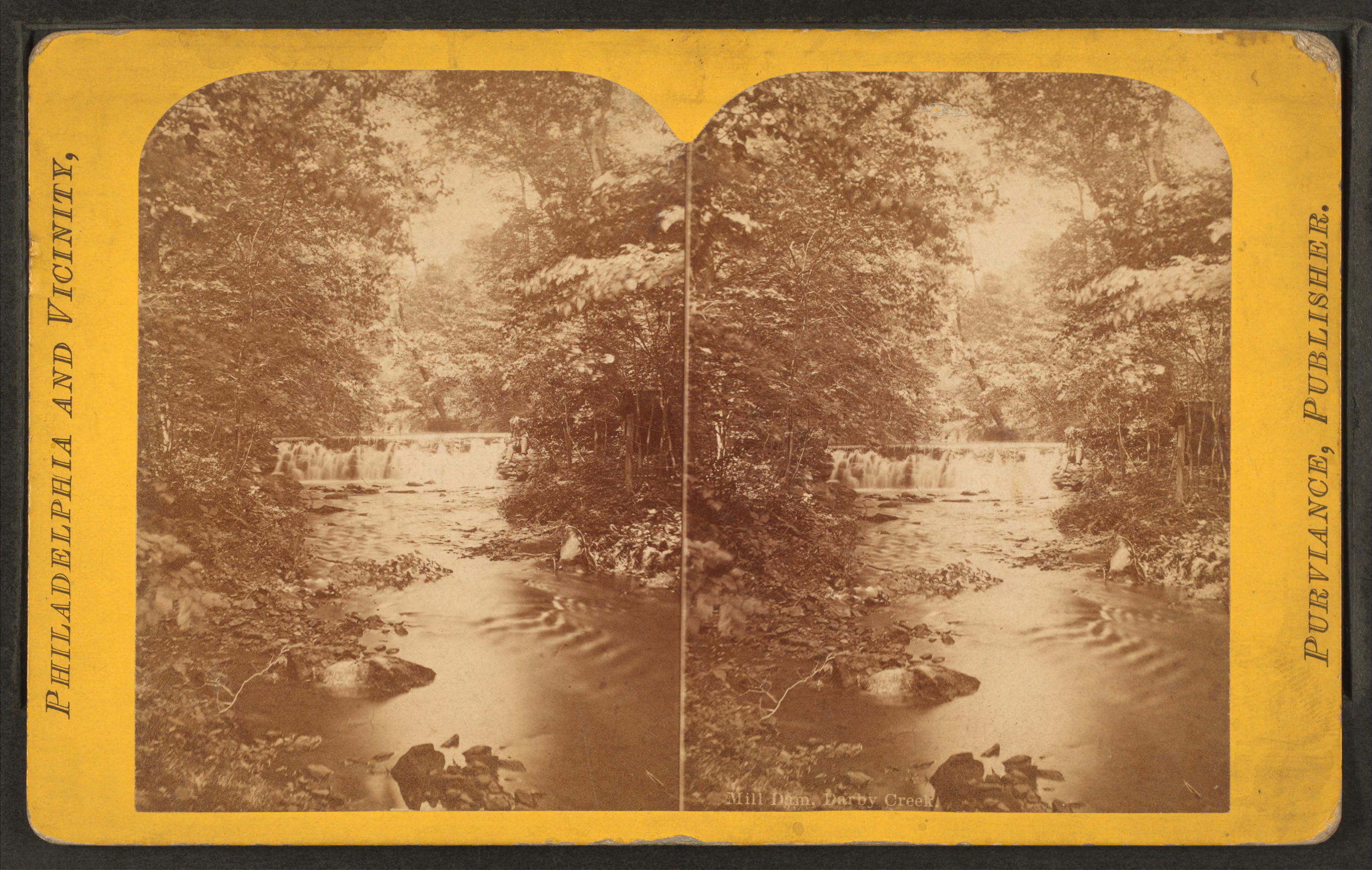
A dam on Darby Creek c. 1870

The English settlers were attracted to the Darby Creek watershed due to the proximity to trading routes and productive landscape. In 1777, British soldiers breached dikes and floodwalls that were constructed on the creek. The Pennsylvania legislature passed an act in 1788 that mandated a maintenance of the dikes and the mowing of plants such as elderberries and pokeweed three times a year. Early English colonists utilized Darby Creek as a source of water power. Lumber, grist, and textile mills were established along the banks of the creek. Most of these mills have been demolished, although some of the tenement structures are currently in use as housing. At the end of the 19th century, industrial advances such as engine-driven machinery had made these mills obsolete.

=== After 1900 ===
The advent of railroads in the late 19th century led to further development in the watershed of Darby Creek. Stops along the Pennsylvania Railroad such as Darby, Prospect Park, and Ridley Park increased in population greatly. Concern for the health of the creek led Lansdowne residents to raise funds to preserve a stretch of the creek in 1910. In the early 1900s, the major industries in the watershed of Darby Creek included agriculture; however, in modern times, agriculture is only carried out in a few small areas in the watershed's upper reaches. During this time period, railroads such as the Pennsylvania Railroad, the Philadelphia, Baltimore and Washington Railroad, and the Baltimore and Ohio Railroad crossed the watershed. A gauging station was established on the creek at Landsowne in 1911.

Nature's Plan For Parkways – Recreational Lands was published in 1932 and proposed a regional plan that would place Darby and Cobbs Creeks in an interior network of parks. These streams were chosen due to the fact that the flowed through some of the most densely populated areas in Southeastern Pennsylvania and it could serve as buffers through urban areas. During the 1930s there were a number of projects undertaken on Darby Creek by the Army Corps of Engineers. The dikes along the southern end of the creek were repaired by a joint force of the Works Progress Administration, the Pennsylvania legislature, and Delaware County. A series of ditches in the Tinicum marshland were constructed by the Corps in 1935 as a means of mosquito control. The dredged material was deposited throughout the marsh over the next few years.

After World War II, residential development continued to expand in the watershed of Darby Creek. The automobile replaced railroads as the dominant form of transportation, and it allowed workers to live farther from their places of employment. As a result, the population of Springfield Township more than doubled between 1950 and 1960. The Tinicum Wildlife Preserve was established in 1955 after the Gulf Oil Corporation donated a diked impoundment on the creek to the City of Philadelphia. Local resident Jean Diehl started a grassroots campaign to preserve the marsh in 1969, and Two Studies of Tinicum Marsh was published the following year which demonstrated the ecological importance of the marsh. The Folcroft Landfill and the Clearview Landfill operated along the creek between the 1950s and the 1970s before closing in the mid 1970s. The former is on the west bank of the creek and the latter is on the east bank. They supposedly accepted municipal waste, demolition waste, and medical waste. A number of businesses operated at the site of the Clearview Landfill after its closing.

On September 16, 1999, when Hurricane Floyd struck Pennsylvania, Upper Darby Township received seven inches of rainfall, causing massive flooding in Darby Creek. Forty-three homes were deemed uninhabitable in Darby and were purchased by the borough. They were demolished in 2000 and the open space was converted into John Bartram Memorial Park in honor of the botanist and Darby native. In Springfield Township, Rolling Green Park was expanded when six homes were ravaged by the hurricane and had to be demolished.

A number of studies have been carried out on the creek and its watershed. These include the Darby Creek Stream Valley Park Master Plan in 1987 and the Greenway Plan for the Darby Creek Watershed in 2011. A $1047 Pennsylvania Growing Greener grant was given to Delco Anglers and Conservationists for riparian restoration on Darby Creek. Another Growing Greener grant, this one for $68,225, was awarded to Marple Township for a streambank stabilization project on the creek. Additionally, a $1000 grant from the Pennsylvania Watershed Restoration Assistance Program was given to Delco Anglers and Conservationists for riparian improvement of the creek and several other creeks. In 1997, a $60,000 grant was given to the Darby Creek Valley Association and DelCo Anglers and Conservationists for developing a conservation plan. The grant was provided by the Pennsylvania Department of Conservation and Natural Resources. The Darby Creek Valley Association is an organization whose purpose is to preserve and improve the creek's watershed. It has approximately 100 members.

== Lower Darby Creek Superfund Site ==
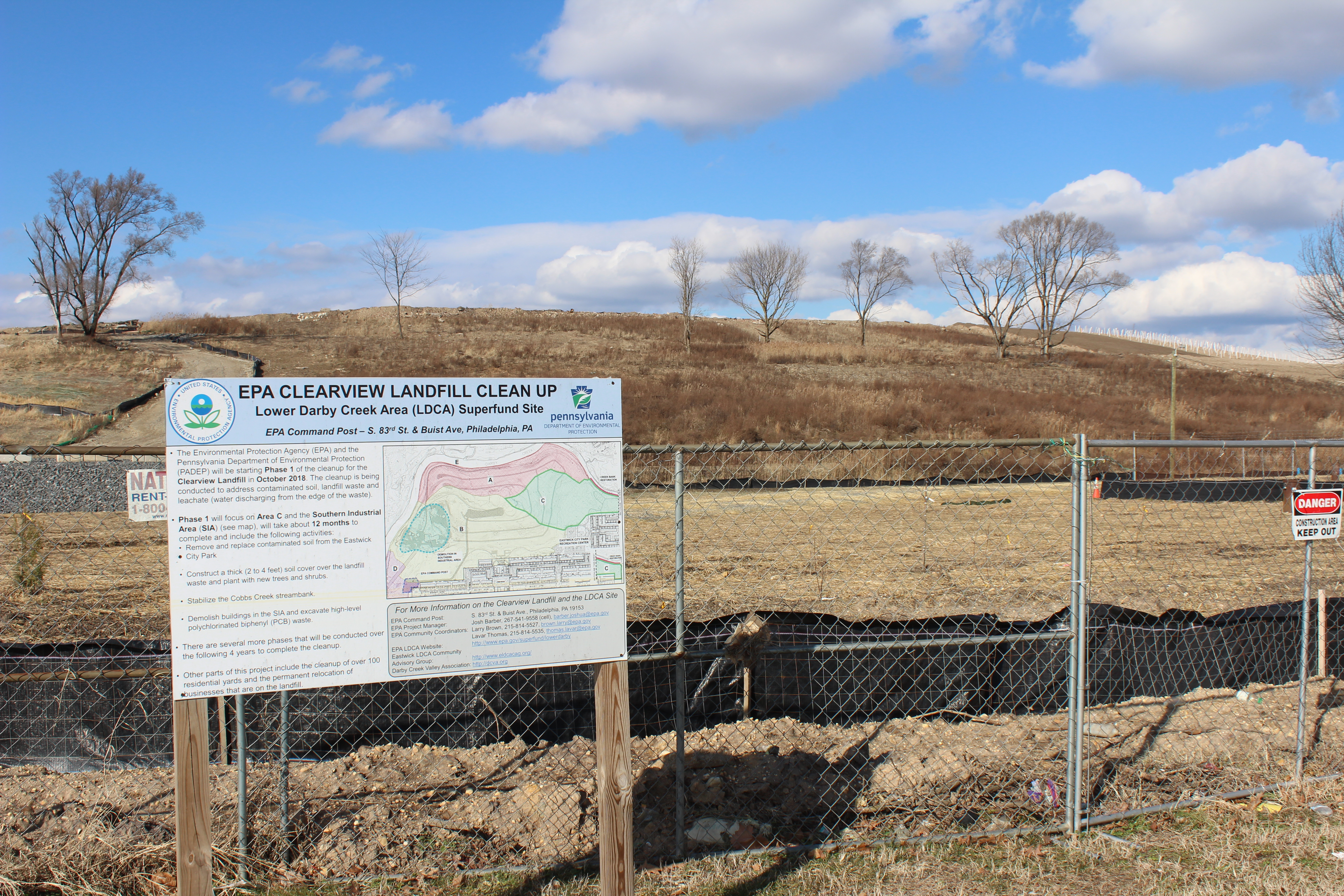
EPA Superfund Signage at the Clearview Landfill with covered landfill in background

In 2001, the U.S. Environmental Protection Agency (EPA) placed Lower Darby Creek Area on the National Priorities List due to contamination from the Folcroft and Clearview landfills. The waste disposal practices at these landfills contaminated the soil, groundwater and fish with hazardous chemicals. In 2011 and 2012, the EPA removed approximately 4,000 tons of soil contaminated with polychlorinated biphenyls (PCBs) and shipped it elsewhere for disposal. In 2014, the EPA selected a remediation plan for the Clearview landfill which called for placement of an evapotranspiration cover over 50 acres of the landfill, relocation of contaminated soil outside the cover to inside, and collection and treatment of leachate from the landfill. In 2016 and 2017, the EPA conducted an additional remediation which involved the removal of approximately 3,000 cubic yards of soil from 33 residential properties due to contamination with PCBs. Implementation of the clean-up plan for the Clearview Landfill began in 2019 and is ongoing. The EPA investigation of the Folcroft landfill and determination of appropriate remediation efforts for that pollution source is ongoing. Local residents are supplied public drinking water and are not drinking groundwater from this location.

== Biology ==
The main stem of Darby Creek is designed as a Coldwater Fishery and a Migratory Fishery from its source to the Pennsylvania Route 3 bridge. From that point downstream to its mouth, the non-tidal portions of the creek's main stem are a Trout Stocked Fishery and a Migratory Fishery. Numerous fish species were observed in the creek during a 2009 electrofishing survey by the Pennsylvania Fish and Boat Commission. The catch per unit effort per hour rate for smallmouth bass was slightly over 10 and the rate for rock bass was under 10. The catch per unit effort per hour rate for redbreast sunfish was 123, the highest of several warmwater streams tested during the survey. Some stocked rainbow trout and brown trout were also captured in the creek. High numbers of American eels were observed in the creek was well. Fish species such as mummichogs, silvery minnows, striped bass, and white perch were found at the head-of-tide of the creek. Brown trout naturally reproduce in the creek's headwaters.

The Ithan-Darby Creek Wetlands and the Darby Creek Mouth Mudflat are listed on the Delaware County Natural Areas Inventory. The former is a "notable significance" site while the latter is an "exceptional significance" site, one of only four in Delaware County. The John Heinz National Wildlife Refuge is also in the vicinity of the creek and is an "exceptional significance" site.

The Darby Creek Mouth Mudflat, which is a remnant tidal flat at the mouth of Darby Creek in Ridley Township and Tinicum Township, is inhabited by 14 "species of concern". At the John Heinz National Wildlife Refuge, which is a tidal estuary along the creek, supports various plant and animal species and is a critical migratory habitat for waterfowl. It is also designated as a National Wildlife Refuge. The Ithan-Darby Creek Wetlands contain old fields, wet meadows, and riparian buffers. They are inhabited by one "species of concern". The population of white-tailed deer in the Darby Creek watershed is large and "ecologically unsustainable", according to the U.S. Fish and Wildlife Service.

Plant species of concern at the Darby Creek Mouth Mudflat include Amaranthus cannabinus, Baccharis halimifolia, Bidens bidentoides, Bidens laevis, Eleocharis obtusa, Eleocharis parvula, Heteranthera multiflora, Lycopus rubellus, Pluchea odorata, Sagittaria calycina, Sagittaria subulata, Schoenoplectus fluviatilis, and Zizania aquatica. Some, such as Eleocharis obtusa, Eleocharis parvula, and Heteranthera multiflora, have not been seen since 1994. However, four other species have been seen as recently as 2009.

At the floodplain at the confluence of Ithan Creek and Darby Creek, the main trees species include silver maple, black willow, boxelder, and red maple. In the wetlands at this site, the main tree species include scattered black willow and silver maple. There are also patches of silky dogwood and wild rose, which are surrounded by assorted wetland plants, including herbs, grasses, sedges, and rushes. However, numerous exotic plants also inhabit the site.

The watershed of Darby Creek and several other nearby creeks house most of the herptiles in Delaware County. The macroinvertebrate communities of the creek mainly consist of Limestone Agricultural Stream communities. No mussel communities have been described on the creek. In the 2000s, the dry weight of periphyton in the creek was 248.2 grams per square meter.

== Recreation ==
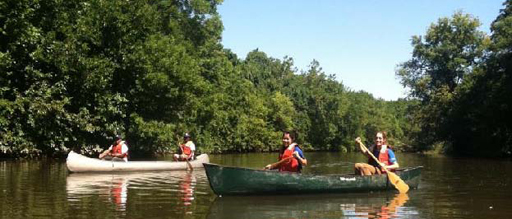
Canoers on Darby Creek

A total of 18.0 miles (29.0 km) of Darby Creek is navigable by canoe. The difficulty rating of the creek ranges from A to 2-. Edward Gertler's book Keystone Canoeing describes the scenery as being "poor to fair" in its upper reach and "poor to good in its lower reach"; however, it is only canoeable within a single day of heavy rain in from river mile 18 to river mile 7.2. It is canoeable at any time in its lower 7.2 miles.

The Darby Creek Trail is a mile-long trail that follows the creek in Haverford Township and is anchored by Merry Place, a park and nature area at its southern end. A multi-use trail along Darby Creek has been proposed. The trail would run from Garrett Road in Upper Darby Township to Pine Street in the borough of Darby. The trail was approved by the Delaware County Council in March 2017. A portion of this trail in Drexel Hill along a stretch of the creek that formerly hosted criminal activity was completed in 2018.

There are many public parks that line Darby Creek, with some having large recreation areas with athletic fields for baseball, soccer, and football, and others containing woodlands and nature trails. There are a total of eight golf clubs bordering the creek, featuring some of the largest stretches of undeveloped land in the watershed. The John Heinz National Wildlife Refuge offers many recreational activities such as hiking and canoeing. The Ridley Township marina is located on the lower end of the creek.

Darby Creek is a popular site for angling. It is stocked annually by the Pennsylvania Fish and Boat Commission, and by a number of local sportsman organizations. The former has been stocking progressively fewer trout every year for some time.

== See also ==
- List of rivers of Pennsylvania
