= Little Darby Creek (Pennsylvania) =

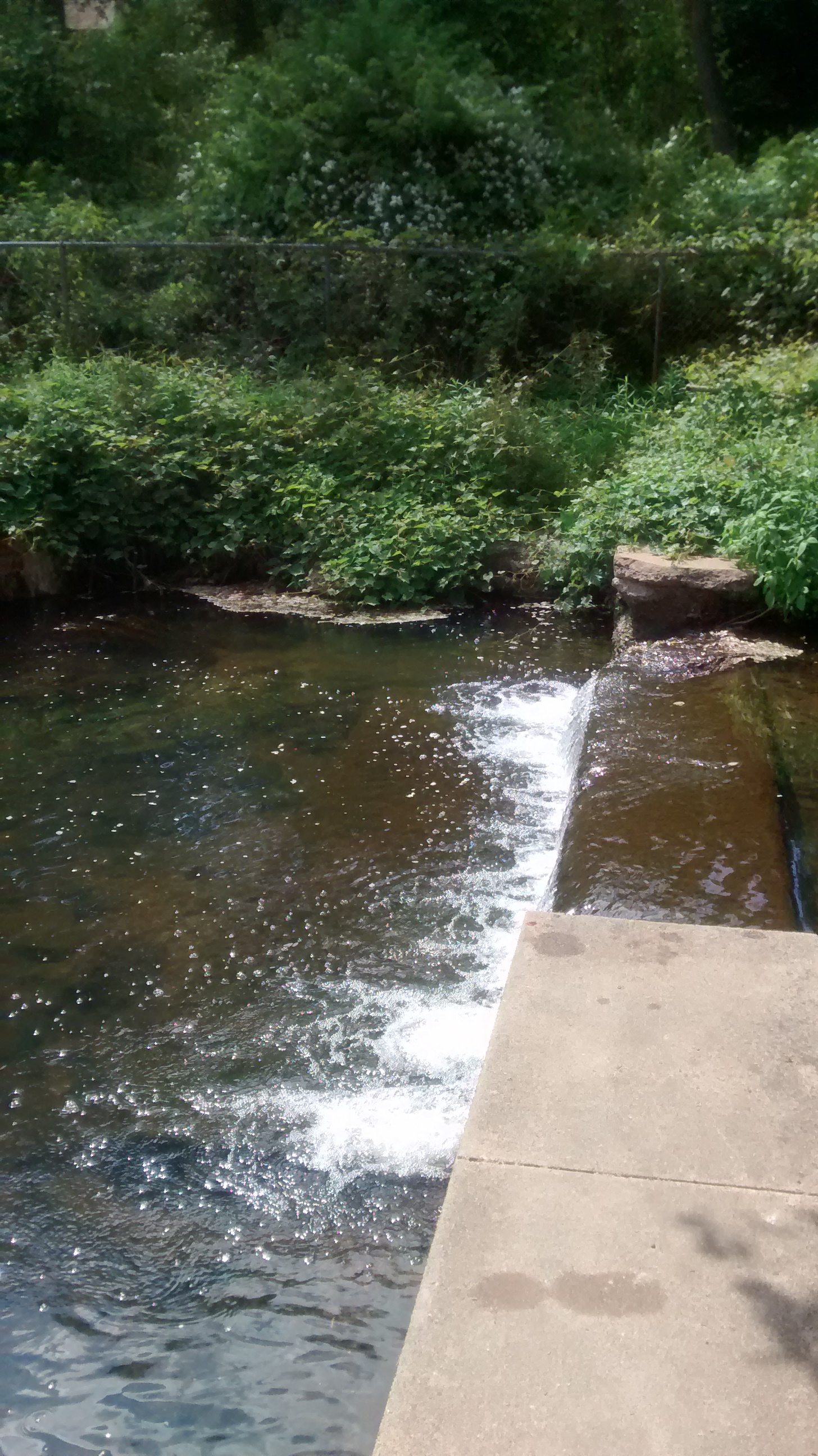
- Little Darby Creek in Villanova, Pennsylvania

Physical characteristics
- Source
  - location: Radnor Township, Delaware County, Pennsylvania
  - elevation: between 380 and 400 feet (120 and 120 m)
- Mouth
  - location: Darby Creek in Radnor Township, Delaware County, Pennsylvania
  - coordinates: 40°00′47″N 75°23′17″W
  - elevation: 223 ft (68 m)
- Length: 2.6 mi (4.2 km)
- Basin size: 3.51 sq mi (9.1 km^{2})

Basin features
- Progression: Darby Creek → Delaware River → Delaware Bay
- Tributaries
  - left: Julip Run
  - right: Wigwam Run

Little Darby Creek is a tributary of Darby Creek in Delaware County, Pennsylvania, in the United States. It is approximately 2.6 miles (4.2 km) long and flows through Radnor Township.

== Course ==
Little Darby Creek begins just south of U.S. Route 30 near the community of Wayne, Pennsylvania. It flows south-southeast for several tenths of a mile before turning southeast and entering the Mill Club Pond. Shortly thereafter, it receives an unnamed tributary from the right. It turns south and receives Julip Run from the left and an unnamed tributary from the right. Little Darby Creek then turns southeast and parallels Darby Paoli Road for a stretch. The creek receives Wigwam Run from the right and flows southward. After several hundred feet, it reaches its confluence with Darby Creek.

Little Darby Creek joins Darby Creek 20.8 miles (33.5 km) upriver of its mouth.

== Geography and geology ==
The elevation near the mouth of Little Darby Creek is 223 feet (68 m) above sea level. The elevation of the creek's source is between 380 and 400 feet (120 and 120 m) above sea level.

Little Darby Creek is within the Piedmont Uplands physiographic province. The Piedmont Uplands section has generally old, hard upland rocks that eroded from the Appalachian Mountains. The rocks in the watershed date to the Precambrian Era and Lower Paleozoic Era. The surficial geology mainly consist of felsic gneiss and mafic gneiss formations, with small amounts of serpentinite near the mouth of the creek.

Two soil associations exist in the Little Darby Creek watershed. The Neshaminy-Lehigh-Glenlg soil association is prevalent in much of the watershed. It consists of silty, well drained, gravelly, and deep soil that rests on gabbro and granodiorite bedrock. The Chester-Glenlg-Manor soil association is prevalent through the middle of the watershed. It consists of silty, channery, and shallow to deep soil that rests on brown schist and gneiss bedrock. Most of the watershed is considered to have slightly erodible soil.

== Watershed ==
The watershed of Little Darby Creek has an area of 3.51 square miles (9.1 km^{2}). The entire creek is in the United States Geological Survey quadrangle of Valley Forge. The majority of the land use is considered residential with some open space. The creek periodically floods during large rain events. Culverts along the creek tend to be undersized. The lower 1.73 miles of Little Darby Creek are considered to be impaired.

== History ==
Little Darby Creek was entered into the Geographic Names Information System on August 2, 1979. Its identifier in the Geographic Names Information System is 1179519.

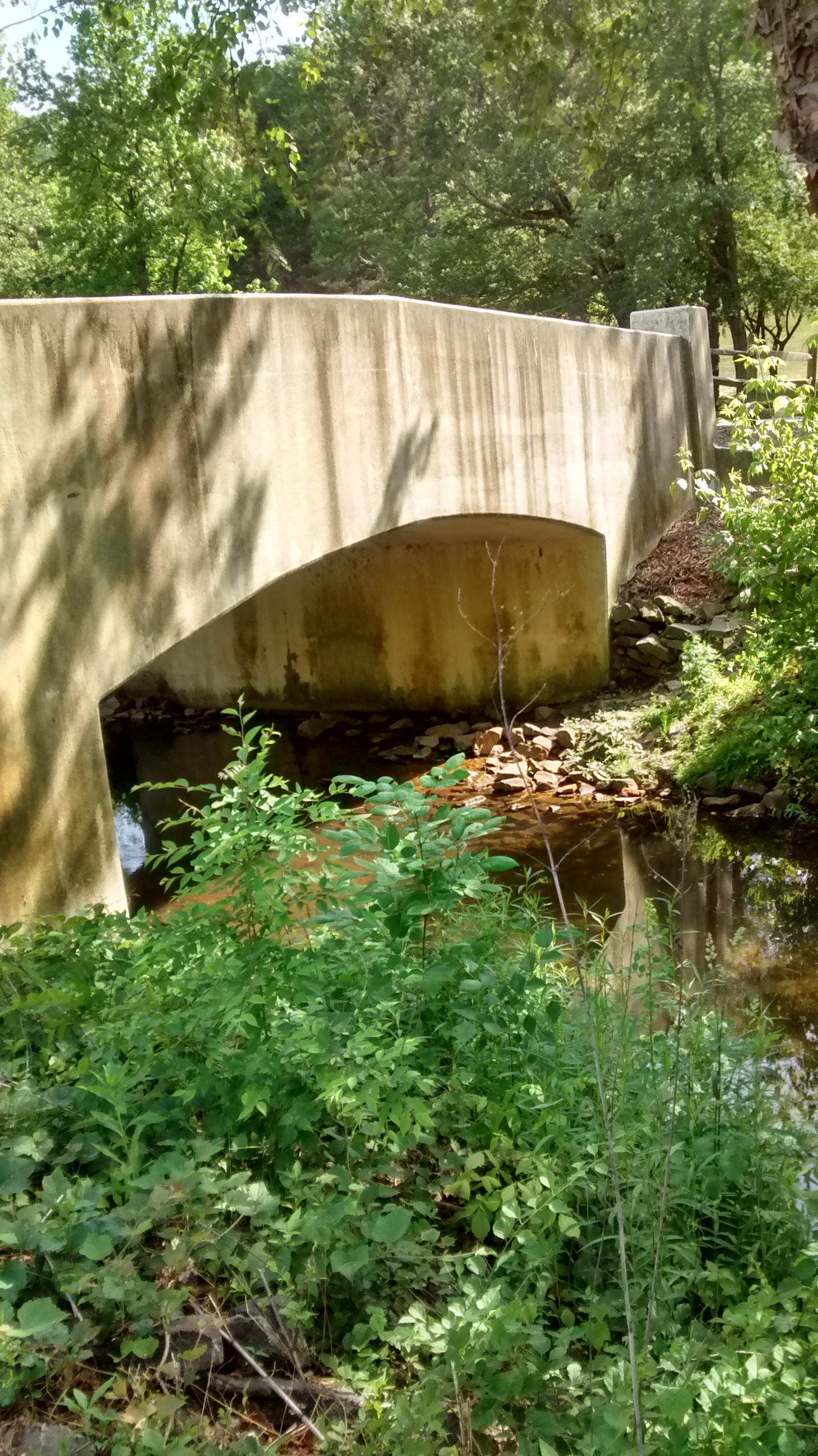
A bridge over Little Darby Creek at the Willows park

Several bridges have been built across Little Darby Creek. A masonry arch bridge with a length of 24 feet (7.3 m) carries Darby Paoli Road over the creek and was built in 1840.

== Biology ==
The drainage basin of Little Darby Creek is a Coldwater Fishery and a Migratory Fishery. It is in approved trout waters. Recently it has been overgrown with kudzu, a high-climbing perennial vine from eastern Asia. This extremely invasive plant was promoted by the Soil Conservation Service in the 1930s as a means of controlling erosion. Its vines are killed by frosts every year but the fleshy roots survive.

== See also ==
- List of rivers of Pennsylvania
