= John Heinz National Wildlife Refuge at Tinicum =

Protected area in Pennsylvania, United States

- IUCN category IV (habitat/species management area)
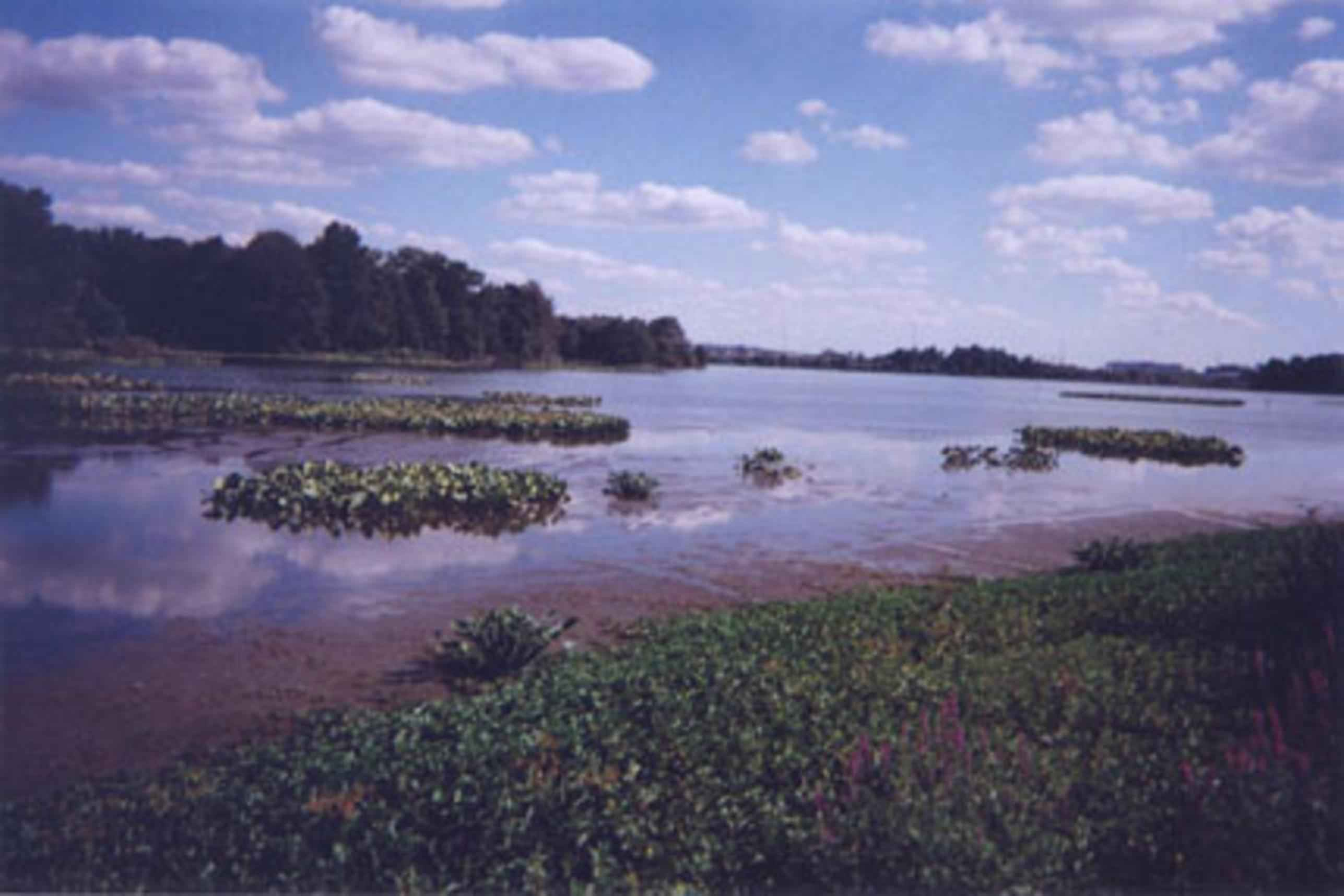
- The centerpiece of John Heinz NWR is a large impoundment, containing wetland habitat with "islands" of vegetation

- Location within the United States
- Location: Delaware County and Philadelphia County, Pennsylvania, U.S.
- Nearest city: Philadelphia, Pennsylvania, U.S.
- Coordinates: 39.885866°N 75.262356°W
- Area: 1,200 acres (4.9 km^{2})
- Established: 1972
- Governing body: U.S. Fish and Wildlife Service
- Website: John Heinz National Wildlife Refuge at Tinicum

U.S. National Natural Landmark
- Designated: 1965

The John Heinz National Wildlife Refuge at Tinicum is a 1000-acre (4.05 km^{2}) National Wildlife Refuge in Philadelphia and Tinicum Township, Pennsylvania. Adjacent to Philadelphia International Airport, the refuge protects the largest remaining freshwater tidal marsh in Pennsylvania. Established in 1972 as the Tinicum National Environmental Center, it was renamed in 1991 after the late H. John Heinz III, who helped preserve Tinicum Marsh.

== History ==
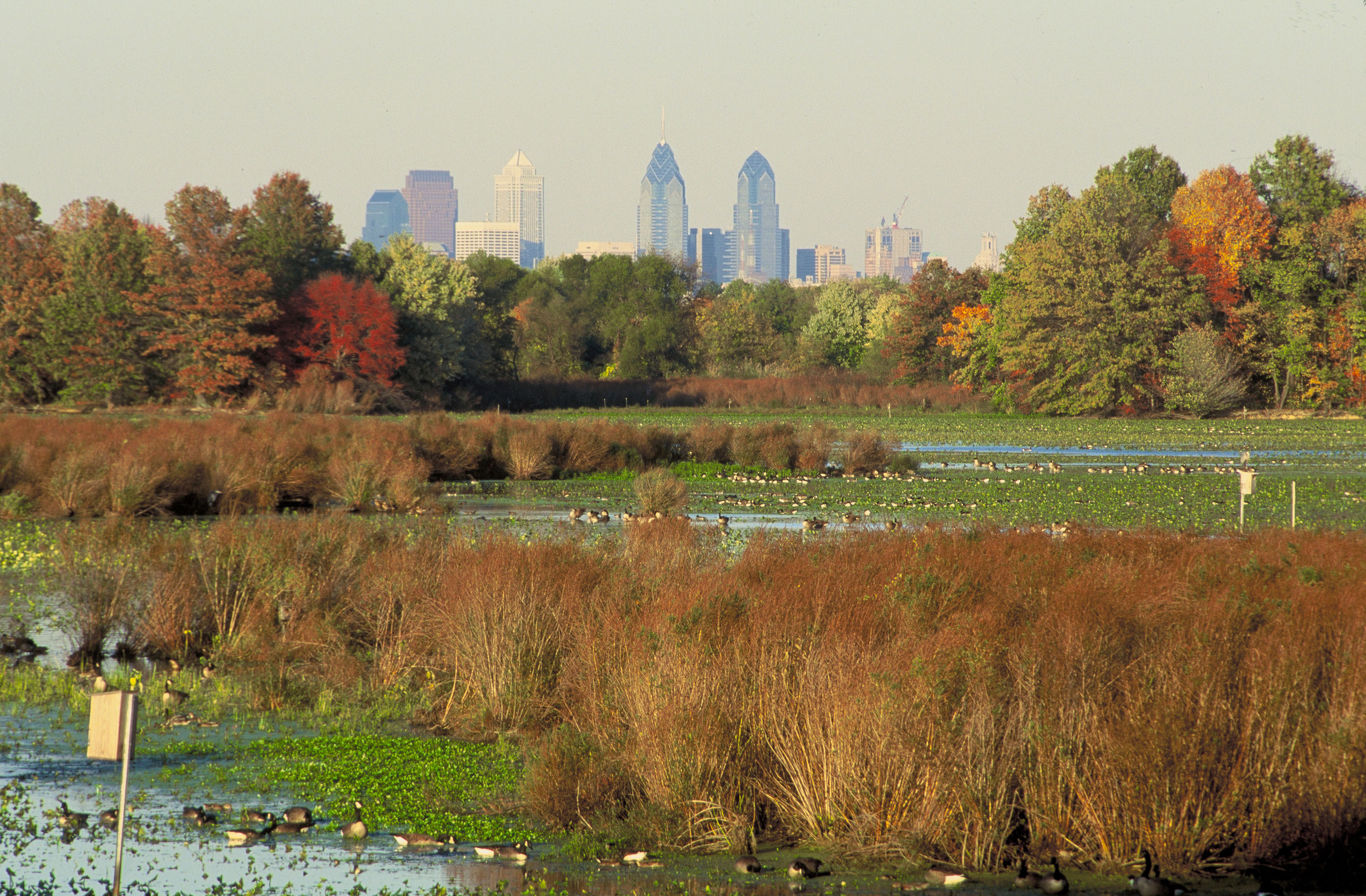
Philadelphia, the nation's sixth largest city, is easily visible from the refuge.

The Lenape people are the first known settlers of the area that is now known as Philadelphia. The Lenape name for Tinicum Marsh was Tennakon Minquas, or "islands of the marsh". The Lenape fished, hunted, and gathered in the land around the marshes until the mid-1600s, when European settlers colonized the area. Before the settlers' arrival, the marshland spread for more than 5,000 acres. The settlers drained and filled the marshes to provide grazing and farming land. Over the years, as the city of Philadelphia grew, the marshes continued to disappear. By the 1950s, Tinicum Marsh had gone from more than 5,000 acres to only 200 acres.

In the late 1760s, it was discovered by the Darby Society of Friends that the Elliot family was running a slave plantation on Smith Island. This was contrary to their orders of discipline. A committee of Nathan Garrett & William Horne were sent to negotiate a settlement. After at least 25 visits, Elliot and the visiting committee came to an agreement in 1765. He agreed to codify the agreement in his will. In his will, he gave a pension, a house, and 2 acres of land at Smith Field (now part of Tinicum Wildlife Preserve) to his slave Old Primus, who was freed immediately. He also provided for eight negroes besides Old Primus. Through the deal brokered by the Darby Friends Meeting and written into Enoch's will, they were to be manumitted when they reached 30 years of age. Their names were Frank, Joe, Betts, Rack, Young Primus, Dina, Peter and Nance. In the meantime, custody was split between his two sons. The will forbade that they be sold or hired out of the area. Enoch died in 1767. His son, Christopher, tried to circumvent the will and was sued by Quakers Thomas Shipley and Isaac Hopper, working through The Pennsylvania Anti-Slavery Society.

In 1953, Allston Jenkins, a birdwatcher who lived in the Chestnut Hill section of Philadelphia, learned of Gulf Oil's plans to dredge the Schuylkill River and dump the spoils into the Marsh. He banded together with other birders and activists to form the Philadelphia Conservationists (later known as Natural Lands, the region's oldest and largest land conservation organization). The group successfully fought the destruction of Tinicum Marsh and a non-tidal area of 145 acres, adjacent to the eastern end of Tinicum Marsh, was donated by the Gulf Oil Corporation to the City of Philadelphia in 1955. This area, administered for the benefit of wildlife and people, was known as Tinicum Wildlife Preserve. The areas of open water along with the adjacent heavily vegetated tidal wetlands, formed an ideal habitat for thousands of migratory birds.

In 1969, threats to Tinicum Marsh continued to rise with the proposed routing of Interstate 95 through the marsh and the construction of a landfill. Local residents and organizations began to take action, as they had seen enough habitat destruction done to the marshlands. They worked together to begin a long series of legal injunctions, public hearings, and extraordinary efforts that stopped both the highway's rerouting and the landfill's operation.

In 1972, Congress passed legislation authorizing the protection of up to 1,200 acres and established Tinicum National Environmental Center. In 1991, the refuge was renamed posthumously to honor Senator John Heinz and his commitment to the conservation of the marsh.

== Topography ==
The refuge has five varied habitats: freshwater tidal marsh, impounded water, woods, meadow and field. The diversity of such habitats in such a concentrated area make it a natural magnet for all forms of wildlife. In addition to the above-mentioned there are a wide variety of fish species that can be found in both, Darby Creek, the lifeblood of Tinicum Marsh, as well as the 145 acre (0.6 km^{2}) impoundment and the smaller, Hoy's Pond. They include brown bullhead, channel catfish, crappie, carp and small striped bass that utilize the wider expanses of Darby Creek, just before its confluence with the Delaware River, in the earlier stages of their development. The fields and meadows provide open areas where wide arrays of insects including several species of butterflies can be found foraging the dozens of species of wildflowers.

== Wildlife and protected species ==
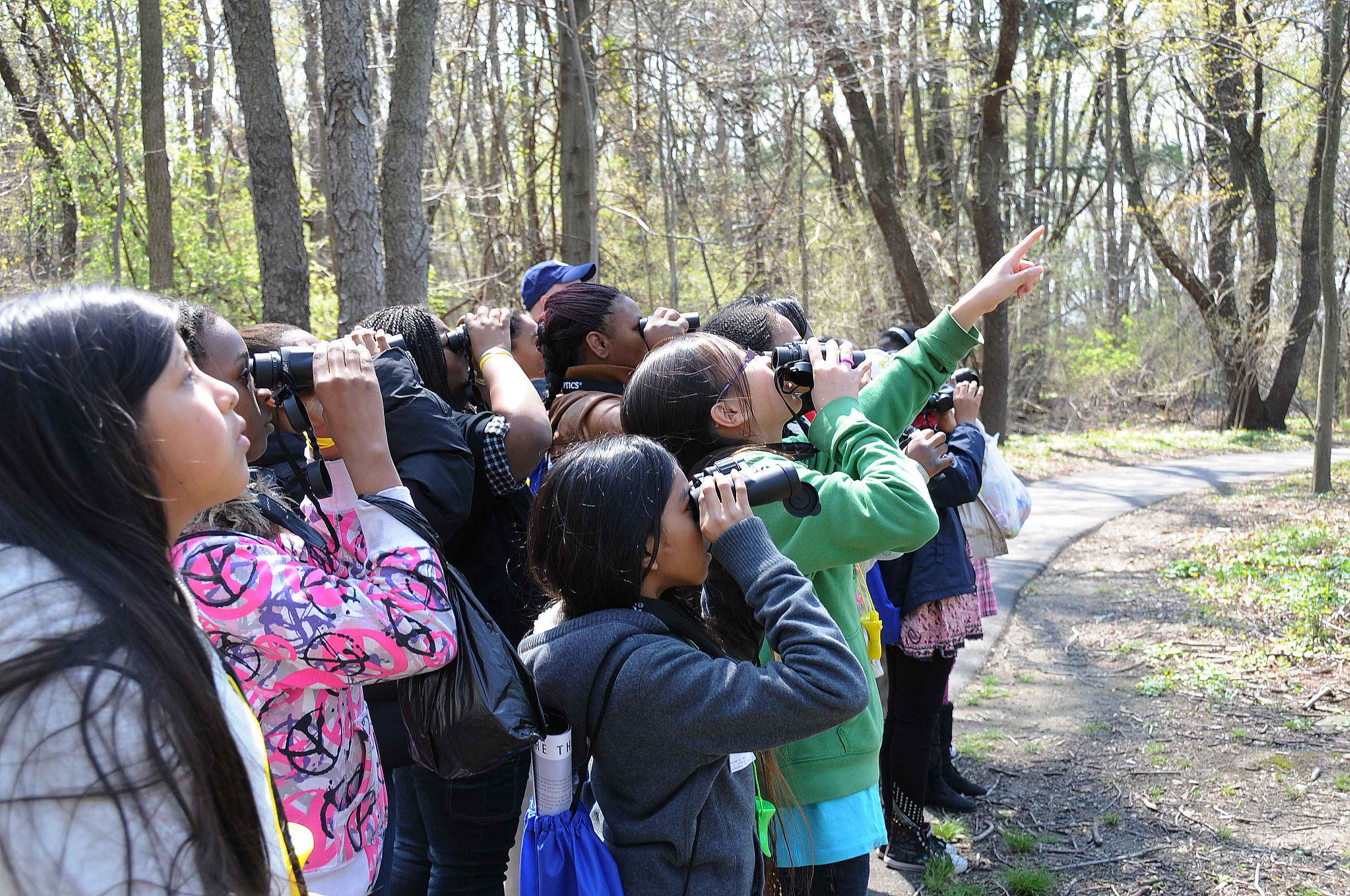
Birdwatching is one of the most popular activities at John Heinz NWR as it has been known to host a total of over 300 species of birds.

The refuge is home to a variety of wildlife despite its urban location. Birdwatchers have recorded over 300 species of birds in and around the refuge, 85 of which nest here. Migratory birds like warblers, egrets, sandpipers, and a large variety of ducks, within the Atlantic Flyway, use the refuge as a resting/feeding spot during spring and fall flights. Since water levels can be controlled in the impoundment, the water is often drained in early fall at the refuge. This serves both to reduce the large population of invasive carp and makes the impoundment a large mudflat, which renders it very attractive to migrating shorebirds. The water levels are raised later in the fall so waterfowl can use the impoundment.

In addition, deer, opossums, red foxes, raccoons, coyotes, beavers, river otters, minks, woodchucks, and muskrats take refuge here along with a wide variety of wildflowers and plants.

Bats are frequently observed by visitors on the refuge during warmer seasons and a formal species diversity and population survey would provide valuable information on recent declines of these important creatures due to white nose syndrome and habitat disturbances.

There are several species of reptiles and amphibians that call the refuge home including the northern water, garter and DeKay's brown snakes; pickerel, wood and southern leopard frogs (the latter listed as endangered in Pennsylvania) and the state threatened American red-bellied turtle, northern red-bellied cooters, as well as the painted, snapping and eastern box turtles.

== Climate ==
John Heinz National Wildlife Refuge at Tinicum lies in the transition zone between the Temperate Continental climate to the north and the Humid subtropical climate to the south. According to the Trewartha climate classification system, the refuge has a Temperate Oceanic climate (Do) with hot summers (a), cool winters (k) and year-around precipitation. Doak climates are characterized by all months having an average mean temperature > 32.0 °F (0 °C), four to seven months with an average mean temperature ≥ 50.0 °F (10 °C), at least one month with an average mean temperature ≥ 72.0 °F (22 °C) and no significant precipitation difference between seasons. Although most summer days are moderately humid at John Heinz National Wildlife Refuge, episodes of heat and high humidity can occur with heat index values > 111 °F (44 °C). Since 1981, the highest air temperature was 102.9 °F (39 °C) on 07/22/2011, and the highest average mean dew point was 77.3 °F (25 °C) on 07/15/1995. The average wettest month is July which corresponds with the annual peak in thunderstorm activity. Since 1981, the wettest calendar day was 6.58 inches (167 mm) on 08/27/2011. During the winter months, the plant hardiness zone is 7a with an average annual extreme minimum air temperature of 5.1 °F (−15 °C). Since 1981, the coldest air temperature was −5.8 °F (−21 °C) on 01/22/1984. Episodes of extreme cold and wind can occur with wind chill values < −5 °F (−21 °C). Ice storms and large snowstorms depositing over 12 inches (30 cm) occur once every several years, particularly during nor'easters from December through February.

Climate data for John Heinz National Wildlife Refuge at Tinicum Visitor Center. 1981-2010 Averages (1981-2018 Records).
Month	Jan	Feb	Mar	Apr	May	Jun	Jul	Aug	Sep	Oct	Nov	Dec	Year
Record high °F (°C)	71.7 (22.1)	77.4 (25.2)	85.6 (29.8)	94.0 (34.4)	95.2 (35.1)	97.9 (36.6)	102.9 (39.4)	100.5 (38.1)	98.9 (37.2)	88.8 (31.6)	81.4 (27.4)	74.2 (23.4)	102.9 (39.4)
Mean daily maximum °F (°C)	40.6 (4.8)	44.2 (6.8)	52.3 (11.3)	63.6 (17.6)	73.6 (23.1)	82.9 (28.3)	87.2 (30.7)	85.5 (29.7)	78.5 (25.8)	67.0 (19.4)	56.1 (13.4)	45.1 (7.3)	64.8 (18.2)
Daily mean °F (°C)	33.7 (0.9)	36.6 (2.6)	43.8 (6.6)	54.4 (12.4)	64.2 (17.9)	73.7 (23.2)	78.5 (25.8)	77.0 (25.0)	69.6 (20.9)	58.2 (14.6)	48.3 (9.1)	38.3 (3.5)	56.5 (13.6)
Mean daily minimum °F (°C)	26.8 (−2.9)	29.0 (−1.7)	35.3 (1.8)	45.2 (7.3)	54.8 (12.7)	64.5 (18.1)	69.7 (20.9)	68.5 (20.3)	60.6 (15.9)	49.5 (9.7)	40.4 (4.7)	31.5 (−0.3)	48.1 (8.9)
Record low °F (°C)	−5.8 (−21.0)	1.7 (−16.8)	6.4 (−14.2)	20.3 (−6.5)	37.5 (3.1)	46.7 (8.2)	53.3 (11.8)	46.8 (8.2)	40.5 (4.7)	29.8 (−1.2)	15.9 (−8.9)	2.3 (−16.5)	−5.8 (−21.0)
Average precipitation inches (mm)	3.27 (83)	2.71 (69)	3.94 (100)	3.73 (95)	3.85 (98)	3.85 (98)	4.58 (116)	3.89 (99)	4.08 (104)	3.51 (89)	3.26 (83)	3.74 (95)	44.41 (1,128)
Average snowfall inches (cm)	6.5 (17)	8.8 (22)	2.9 (7.4)	0.5 (1.3)	0.0 (0.0)	0.0 (0.0)	0.0 (0.0)	0.0 (0.0)	0.0 (0.0)	0.0 (0.0)	0.3 (0.76)	3.4 (8.6)	22.4 (57)
Average relative humidity (%)	64.8	59.4	56.9	56.4	59.9	62.5	63.8	64.9	66.9	66.5	64.5	64.0	62.6
Average dew point °F (°C)	23.1 (−4.9)	23.8 (−4.6)	29.5 (−1.4)	39.2 (4.0)	50.0 (10.0)	60.1 (15.6)	65.2 (18.4)	64.3 (17.9)	58.1 (14.5)	47.1 (8.4)	36.9 (2.7)	27.2 (−2.7)	43.8 (6.6)
Source: PRISM

== Facilities ==
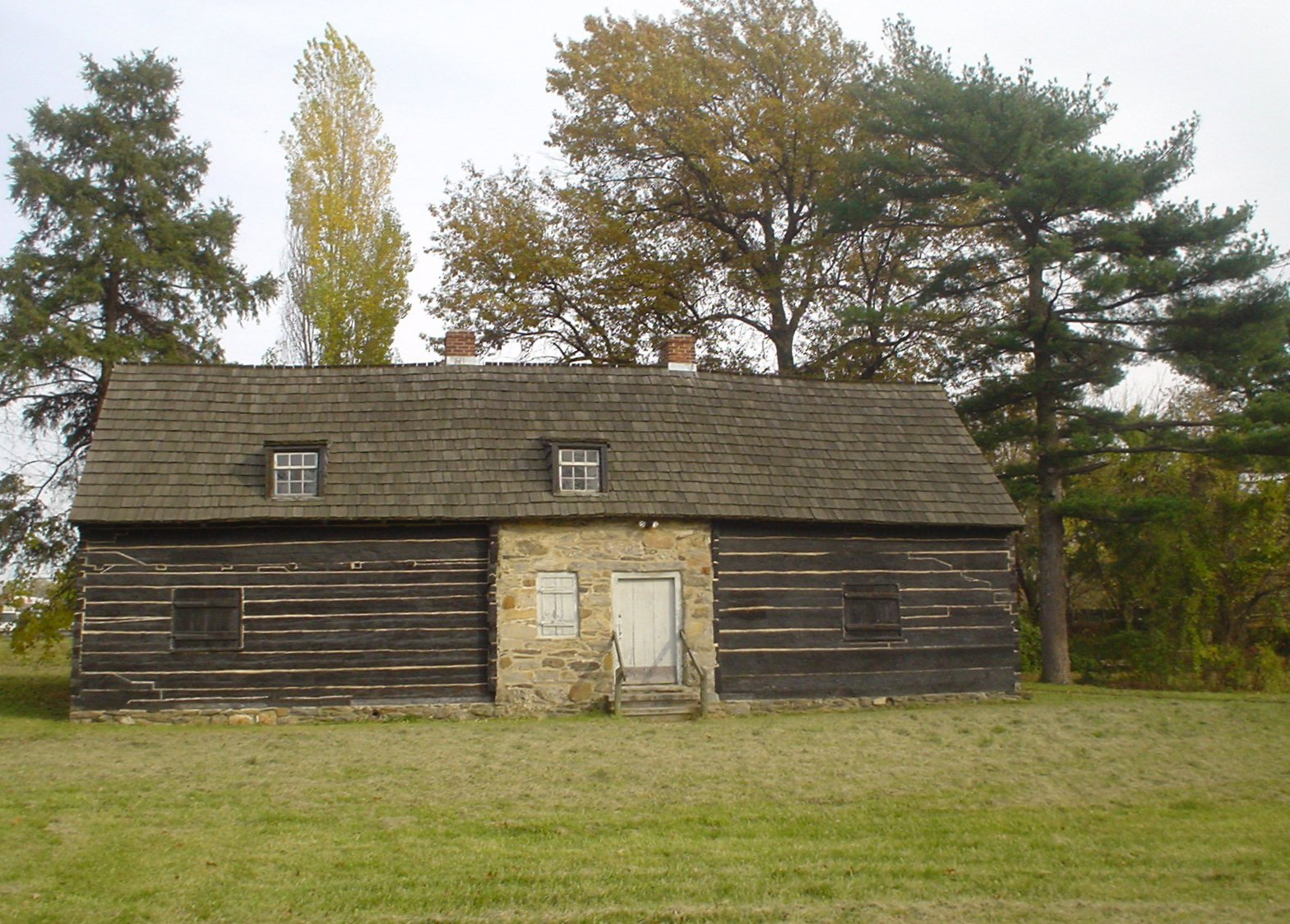
Morton Mortensen Cabin on the refuge

=== Trails ===
There are over 10 miles (16 km) of trails, including the popular Wetland Loop Trail, a boardwalk that cross the emergent wetland, and a boardwalk that stretches out over Tinicum Marsh. Trail segments are a part of the East Coast Greenway, a 3,000 mile long system of trails connecting Maine to Florida.

=== Canoeing ===
A 4.5-mile (7.2 km) segment of Darby Creek flows through the refuge allowing canoeists to see a variety of plants and animals.

Points of interest around the Creek's deep water lagoon are:

- The Sun Oil Company tank farm;
- The defunct Delaware County Sewer Treatment Plant;
- Action Concrete's recycling operation;
- The 62-acre (250,000 m^{2}) Folcroft Landfill (active from 1956 to 1974), now capped and monitored;
- The historic Morton Mortensen House in Norwood's Winona Park, built in the early eighteenth century by adding to an old Swedish house built 60 years before, and believed to be the oldest man-made structure in Pennsylvania.

=== Fishing ===
Fishing is permitted along the main dike trail and the connecting Trolley Bed trail. This area provides fishing in both the 145 acre (0.6 km^{2}) impoundment and Darby Creek. Common fish are carp, catfish, large-mouth bass and smaller panfish. Another fishing area is near Tinicum and Prospect Park on the west side of Route 420 which provides access to the lagoon areas of the refuge. Common fish in this area are striped bass, carp, catfish, panfish, and tiger musky. However, due to the preserve's urban location, the stream has been polluted with various industrial chemicals. As a result, signs have been put into place in order to discourage the consumption of the fish that reside in the stream.

== See also ==
- List of National Wildlife Refuges
- List of parks in Philadelphia
