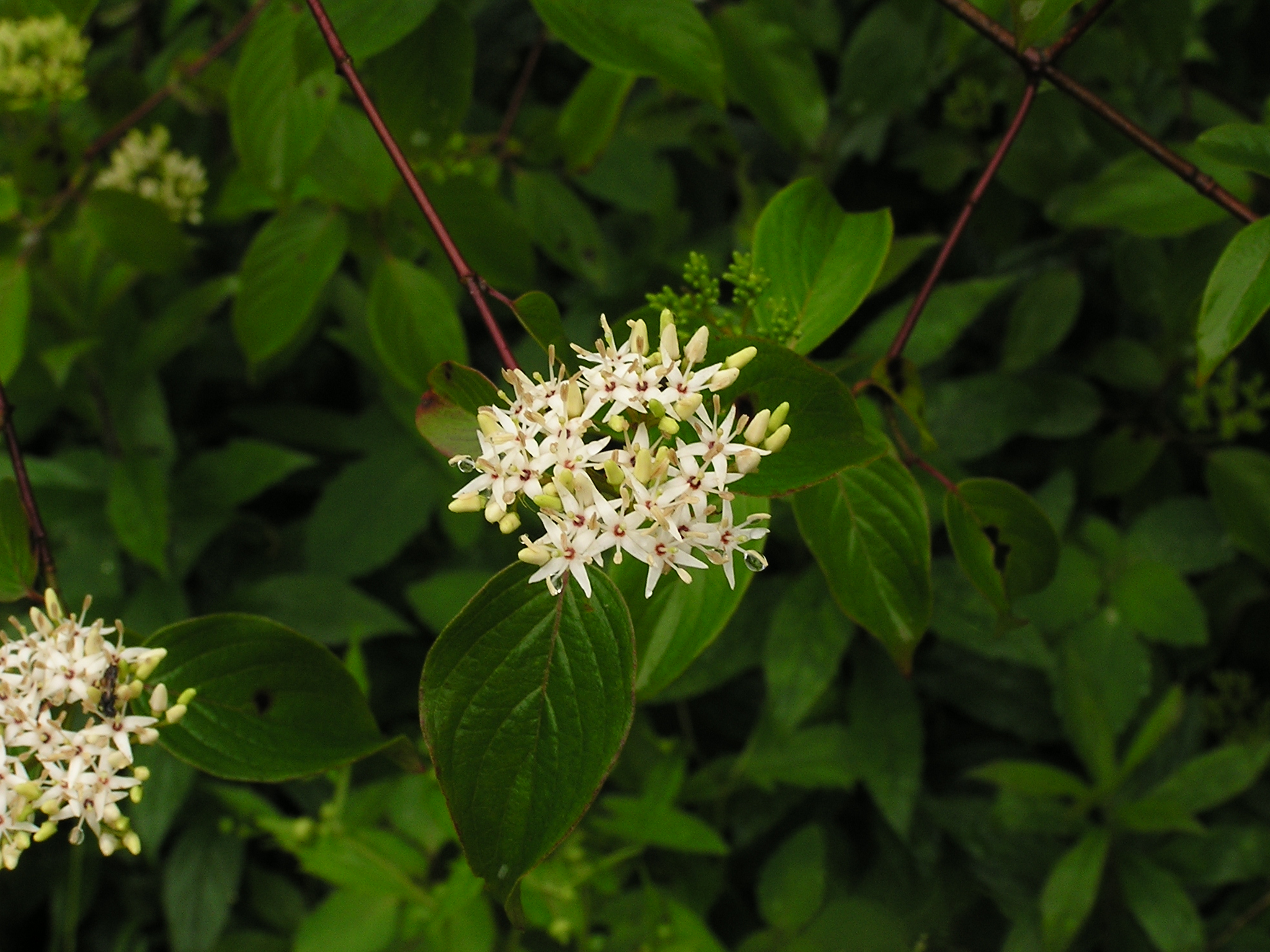
- Flowers.

Conservation status
- Least Concern (IUCN 3.1)

- Secure (NatureServe)

Scientific classification
- Kingdom: Plantae
- Clade: Tracheophytes
- Clade: Angiosperms
- Clade: Eudicots
- Clade: Asterids
- Order: Cornales
- Family: Cornaceae
- Genus: Cornus
- Subgenus: Cornus subg. Kraniopsis
- Species: C. amomum

Binomial name
- Cornus amomum Mill.

= Cornus amomum =

Species of flowering plant

Cornus amomum, the silky dogwood, is a species of dogwood native to southern Ontario and the eastern United States, from Michigan and Vermont south to Alabama and Florida. Other names include red willow, silky cornel, kinnikinnick, and squawbush.

== Description ==
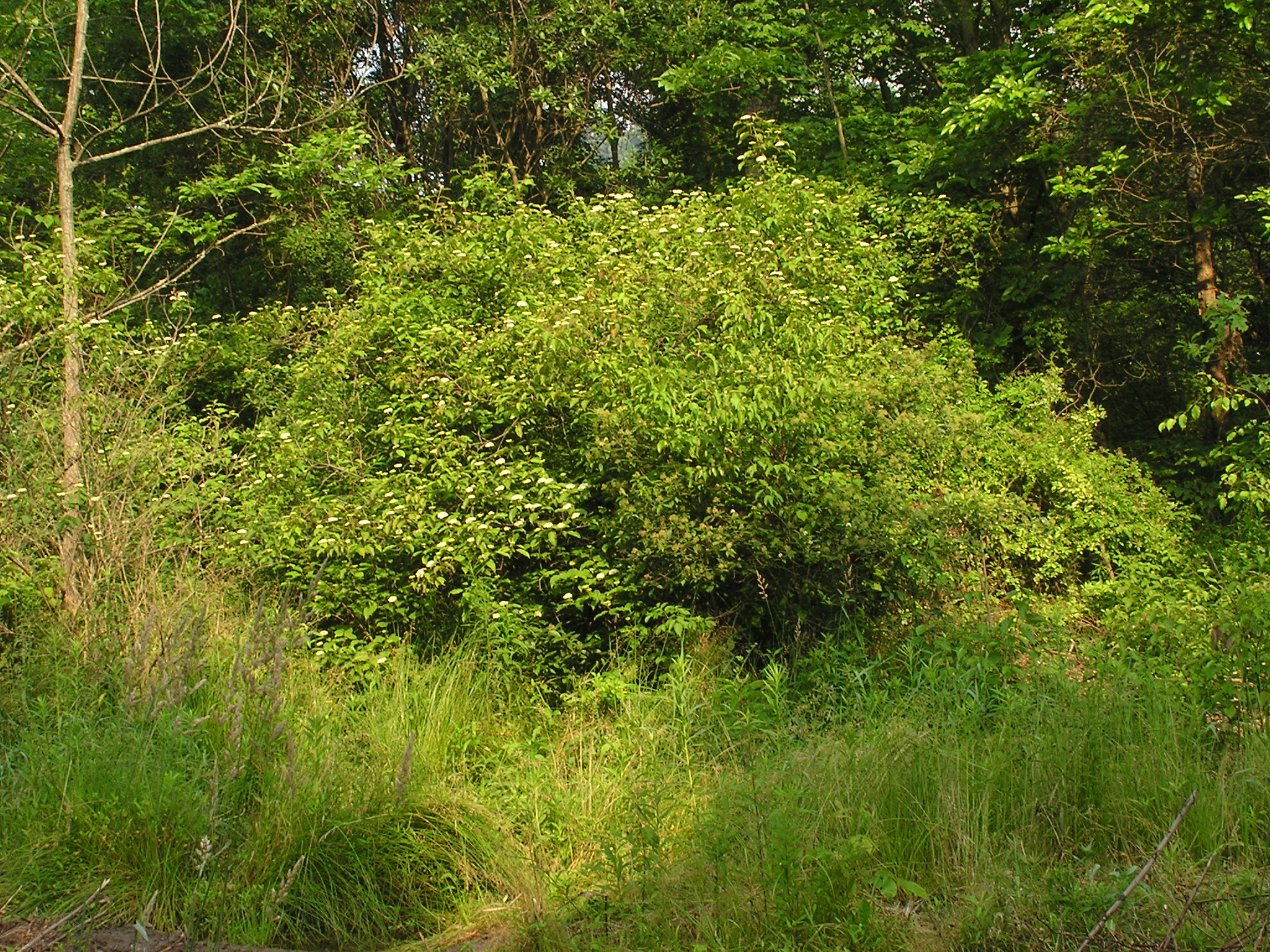
Shrub.

Cornus amomum is a deciduous shrub growing to 5 m (16 1/2 ft) tall. The leaves are opposite, up to 10 cm (4 in) long and 7 cm (2 3/4 in) broad, oval with an acute apex. The flowers are produced in cymes. The fruit is a small blue drupe. Cornus amomum usually blooms between May and June, producing four-petalled showy yellowish white flowers. Cornus amomum leaves are medium green and pubescent, occurring opposite from one another and usually having between 4 and 5 veins per leaf side. Twigs are rusty brown. If Cornus amomum is left unattended it will grow to create thickets and thick vegetative areas.

== Taxonomy ==
Silky dogwood is usually included in the dogwood genus Cornus as Cornus amomum Mill., although it is sometimes segregated in a separate genus as Swida amomum (Mill.) Small. The more northerly-occurring Cornus obliqua was formerly included in this species as Cornus amomum subsp. obliqua (Raf.) J.S. Wilson, but is now generally recognized as a distinct species.

=== Etymology ===
Cornus in Latin means horn, describing the dogwood's hard wood. Amomum in Latin means eastern spice.

== Distribution and habitat ==
Cornus amomum is a native eastern North American shrub, finding suitable habitat in wetland areas like swamps, marshes, and bogs. The distribution of the shrub also extends west past the Mississippi river to the eastern borders of Kansas, Nebraska, and parts of northern Oklahoma. Cornus amomum is only found within the U.S. while other species such as Cornus obliqua can be found in Canada. Cornus amomum prefers partial shade but can tolerate full sun. When planted, the use of organic materials to maintain a wet environment will help the shrub when insufficient water is present. Cornus amomum grows near or around creeks or water systems. Cornus amomum can be found in the following states: West Virginia, Virginia, Vermont, South Carolina, Maine, Kentucky, Iowa, Indiana, Illinois, Georgia, Florida, District of Columbia, Delaware, Connecticut, Alabama, Maryland, Massachusetts, Michigan, Mississippi, Missouri, New Hampshire, New Jersey, New York, North Carolina, Ohio, Pennsylvania, and Rhode Island. Cornus amomum has been found at elevations from 0 to 1,500 feet (0 to 460 m) of elevation.

== Conservation ==
Based on the IUCN Red List classification, The conservation status of Cornus amomum is a Least Concern plant. While Cornus amomum is recognized as Least Concern across the eastern parts of North America, Indiana has Cornus amomum ranked as an endangered plant throughout the state.

== Ecology ==
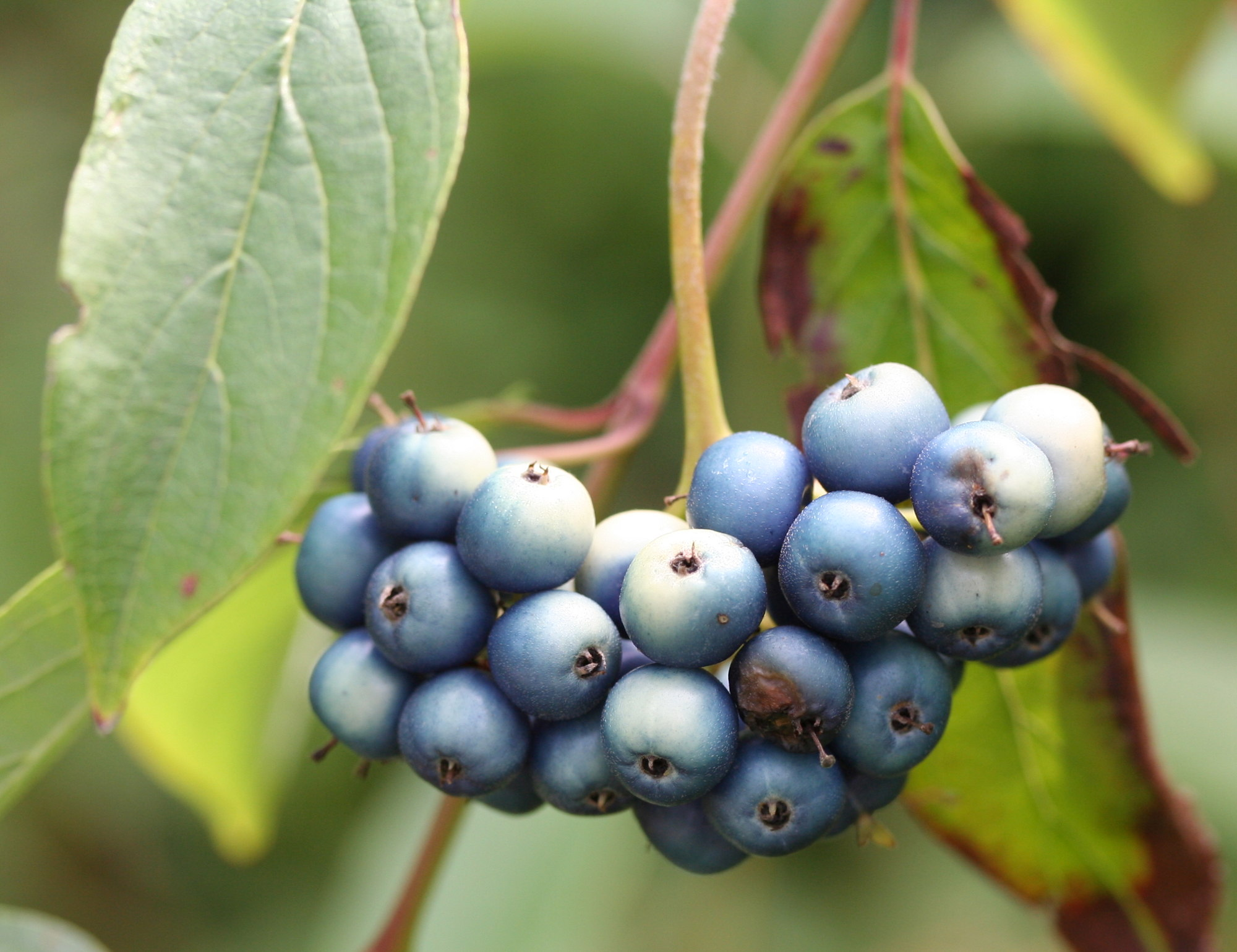
Fruit.

Cornus amomum is primarily used by song birds, insects and rodents for its fruits which are produced in summer. Land dwelling mammals such as white-tailed deer and elk feast on the fruit as well. Cornus amomum uses the animals as a method of seed dispersal. As Cornus amomum fruit decay, frugivores tend to pick only the ripe fruit and seeds, which destroy good seeds that would otherwise be dropped and grow. Cornus amomum has been marked as a pollinator plant, supporting and attracting bees, butterflies, and flies. It is a host plant for butterflies, providing food during their larval stage.

== Uses ==
The dogwood family is desired for ornamental uses in landscapes across the United States. Dogwoods are valued by gardeners for their spring flowers, summer foliage, fruit and leaf color. Each species of dogwood has their own unique look, Cornus amomum is a shrub which can be used in places of excess runoff or areas of water collection in a landscape as it thrives in moist to wet soil conditions. The shrub provides beautiful colors throughout the spring, summer and fall. Cornus amomum has also been used in the outdoors to help with erosion control along slopes and steep inclines, it can be planted by farmers and landowners to provide a windbreaks for homes and agriculture fields, its uses can include building natural borders between land and for wildlife conservation, and it can be used to provide habitat for many types of wildlife. Finally, Cornus amomum can minimize stream bank erosion and add stabilization along banks when coupled together with other well rooted trees and shrubs like willows. Some problems can arise from the use of Cornus amomum as a natural border, mostly as a border for wildlife and livestock. While the shrubs create a useful barrier, grazing wildlife and livestock tend to damage much of the shrub when the fruit are ripe. Other than that, there are no impending diseases or pest which would pose any sort of problem for the shrub.

The bark of the tree was also used in the Native American smoking mixture kinnikinnick. It was scraped into a fine powder and used as an alternative to tobacco.
