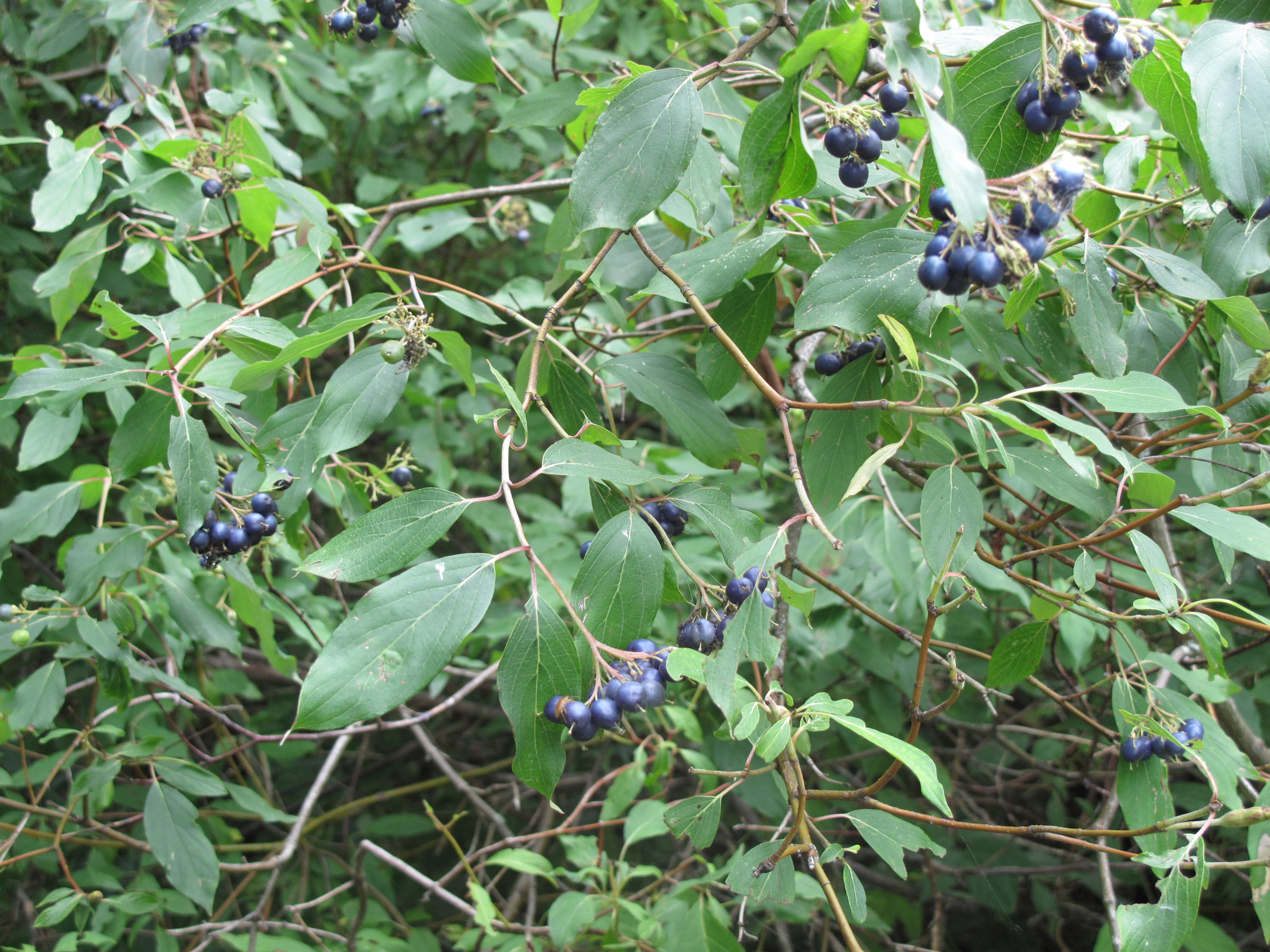

Scientific classification
- Kingdom: Plantae
- Clade: Tracheophytes
- Clade: Angiosperms
- Clade: Eudicots
- Clade: Asterids
- Order: Cornales
- Family: Cornaceae
- Genus: Cornus
- Subgenus: Cornus subg. Kraniopsis
- Species: C. obliqua

Binomial name
- Cornus obliqua Raf.

Synonyms
- Cornus amomum subsp. obliqua (Raf.) J.S.Wilson; Cornus purpusii Koehne; Swida obliqua (Raf.) Moldenke; Swida purpusii (Koehne) Soják; Thelycrania purpusii (Koehne) Pojark.

= Cornus obliqua =

Species of flowering plant

Cornus obliqua, the blue-fruited dogwood, silky dogwood, or pale dogwood, is a flowering shrub of eastern North America in the dogwood family, Cornaceae. It is sometimes considered a subspecies of Cornus amomum, which is also known as silky dogwood. It was first described in 1820 by Constantine Samuel Rafinesque. It is in the subgenus Kraniopsis.

== Description ==
Cornus obliqua is a medium to large shrub that typically grows to a height of 6 to 12 feet (1.8 to 3.7 meters) and has a similar spread. The plant is characterized by its slender, arching stems and oval-shaped leaves. The leaves are simple, opposite, and arranged in an alternate pattern on the stems. They are dark green in color and turn shades of red and purple in the fall, creating a beautiful autumn display.

The most distinctive feature of Cornus obliqua is its small, creamy white flowers. These flowers are borne in flat-topped clusters, known as cymes, and appear in late spring to early summer. The flowers are attractive to pollinators, particularly butterflies and native bees.

Following the flowering period, the plant produces clusters of small, bluish-black drupes that provide food for various wildlife species, including birds and small mammals.

== Distribution and habitat ==
Silky dogwood is native to a wide range of regions in eastern North America, spanning from eastern Canada to Florida and west to Texas. It can be found in various types of wetlands, including swamps, bogs, and riparian areas. Cornus obliqua is well adapted to wet conditions and often serves as a valuable species for stabilizing soil along streambanks and preventing erosion.

== Ecological importance ==
The ecological significance of Cornus obliqua lies in its ability to provide habitat and food for a diverse range of wildlife. The dense shrubbery and the fruit of the plant offer nesting sites and sustenance for many bird species, such as warblers, thrushes, and sparrows. Additionally, the shrub's cover is suitable for various small mammals and amphibians.

In addition to its importance in wildlife habitat, silky dogwood plays a vital role in wetland restoration and erosion control projects. Its extensive root system helps prevent soil erosion, and it contributes to the overall health and stability of wetland ecosystems.

== Landscaping and horticultural use ==
Cornus obliqua is often employed in landscaping for its aesthetic appeal. It is utilized in a variety of settings, including naturalized plantings, rain gardens, and wildlife gardens. Its striking flowers, colorful foliage, and attractive fruit make it a popular choice for adding visual interest to gardens and landscapes. The plant is relatively low maintenance, making it suitable for both amateur and experienced gardeners.

== Conservation status ==
As a native species with a broad distribution, silky dogwood is not currently considered threatened or endangered. However, the destruction and degradation of wetland habitats through urban development and other activities can negatively impact its populations. Conservation efforts to protect and restore wetlands are important for ensuring the continued presence of Cornus obliqua in the wild.
