= Delaware Avenue =

Delaware Avenue could refer to:

- Delaware Avenue in Philadelphia, PA
- Delaware Avenue of Albany, NY

== See also ==
- Delaware Avenue Historic District
