= Interstate 95 in Pennsylvania =

Section of Interstate Highway in United States

Interstate 95
- I-95 highlighted in red

Route information
- Maintained by PennDOT and PTC
- Length: 43.4 mi (69.8 km)
- History: Completed September 22, 2018
- NHS: Entire route

Major junctions
- South end: I-95 / I-495 / DE 92 at the Delaware state line in Ogden
- US 322 in Chester; I-476 in Woodlyn; PA 291 in Philadelphia; I-76 in Philadelphia; I-676 / US 30 in Philadelphia; PA 73 in Philadelphia; PA 63 in Bensalem Township; PA 413 in Bristol Township; I-276 Toll / Penna Turnpike / I-295 in Bristol Township; US 13 in Bristol Township
- North end: I-95 / Pearl Harbor Extension at the New Jersey state line near Tullytown

Location
- Country: United States
- State: Pennsylvania
- Counties: Delaware, Philadelphia, Bucks

Highway system
- Interstate Highway System; Main; Auxiliary; Suffixed; Business; Future; Pennsylvania State Route System; Interstate; US; State; Scenic; Legislative
← PA 94	→ PA 95

Interstate 95 (I-95) is a major north–south Interstate Highway that runs along the East Coast of the United States from Miami, Florida, north to the Canada–United States border at Houlton, Maine. In the state of Pennsylvania, it runs 43.4 miles (69.8 km) from the Delaware state line near Marcus Hook in Delaware County in the southeastern part of the state northeast to the Delaware River–Turnpike Toll Bridge at the New Jersey state line near Bristol in Bucks County, closely paralleling the New Jersey state line for its entire length through Pennsylvania.

From the Delaware state line north to exit 40, the route is officially named the Vietnam Veterans Memorial Highway, but is colloquially known as the Delaware Expressway. North of exit 40, I-95 follows the easternmost portion of the Pennsylvania Turnpike; this portion of road is not signed as part of the turnpike. I-95 parallels its namesake Delaware River for its entire route through the city of Philadelphia and its suburbs. It is a major route through the city and the Philadelphia metropolitan area, providing access to locally important landmarks such as Subaru Park, Philadelphia International Airport, the South Philadelphia Sports Complex, Penn's Landing, and Franklin Mall.

Plans for a limited-access route along the Delaware River in the Philadelphia area originated in the 1930s when both a parkway and elevated highway were proposed; neither of these was built. The Delaware Expressway was approved in 1945 as a toll road that was to be part of the Pennsylvania Turnpike system until the project was turned over to the Pennsylvania Department of Highways in 1956, with the expressway to be included in the Interstate Highway System as part of I-95. Construction on I-95 began in 1959 and was mostly complete by 1979, with the final portion near the Philadelphia International Airport finished in 1985. The route was originally projected to run through the center of Trenton, New Jersey, but was rerouted to the Scudder Falls Bridge to the north due to limited capacity in Trenton. I-95 remained on this alignment until 2018 when the route was truncated to the Pennsylvania Turnpike, being replaced by an extended I-295 north of there. Upon completion of two new high-speed flyovers connecting I-95 and the Pennsylvania Turnpike in 2018, I-95 was extended to the east into New Jersey toward the New Jersey Turnpike along the former I-276 (Pennsylvania Turnpike).

== Route description ==
=== Delaware County ===
I-95 enters Pennsylvania from Delaware in Lower Chichester Township, Delaware County, a short distance north of the southbound exit and northbound entrance with the northern terminus of I-495. The ramp from southbound I-95 to southbound I-495 splits immediately north of the state line. From the Delaware state line, I-95 heads northeast as the Delaware Expressway (Vietnam Veterans Memorial Highway), a six-lane freeway. The route runs through wooded areas, passing over Pennsylvania Route 491 (PA 491) without an interchange and coming to a northbound welcome center and weigh station. The road enters Upper Chichester Township and reaches a partial cloverleaf interchange with Chichester Avenue near the community of Boothwyn. Past this interchange, the freeway passes near residential areas and comes to the partial cloverleaf interchange at PA 452 to the north of the borough of Marcus Hook. I-95 continues east-northeast through woods and heads to the south of CSX Transportation's Twin Oaks Rail Yard, an automotive unloading facility. The road comes to an interchange with U.S. Route 322 (US 322) and Highland Avenue, with I-95 having a southbound exit and northbound entrance with US 322 and a complete interchange with Highland Avenue. At this point, US 322 becomes concurrent with I-95 and the roadway enters the city of Chester, gaining a fourth northbound lane and passing through urban residential neighborhoods. The freeway crosses into Chester Township and heads near more development in the community of Feltonville before US 322 splits from I-95 at a directional T interchange to head southeast on a freeway toward the Commodore Barry Bridge over the Delaware River. US 322 provides access from I-95 to the Chester Waterfront and Subaru Park, the home stadium of the Philadelphia Union of Major League Soccer.

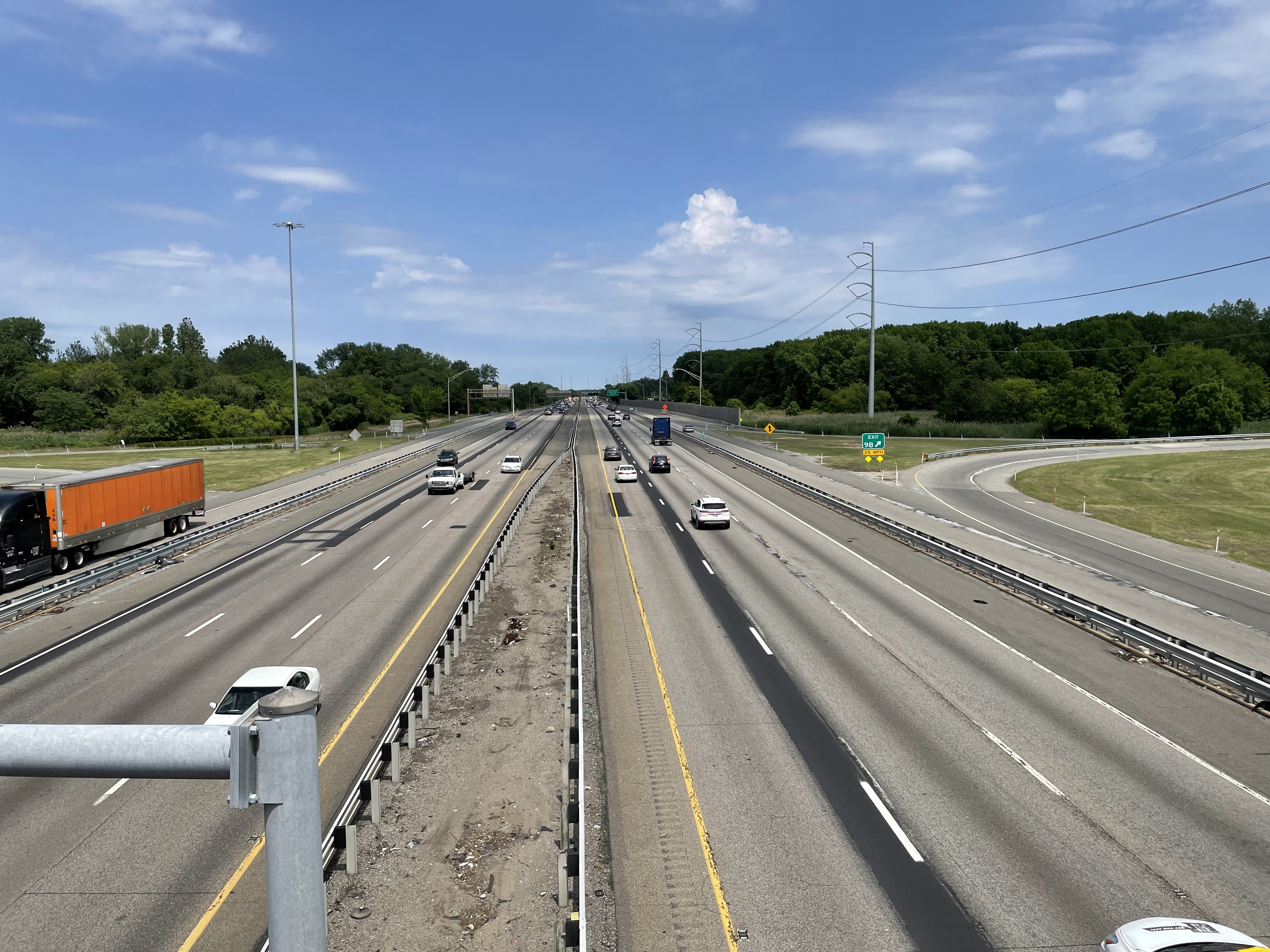
I-95 northbound at the PA 420 interchange in Tinicum Township

From here, I-95 heads back into the city of Chester and runs between CSX Transportation's Philadelphia Subdivision railroad line to the northwest and urban areas to the southeast, coming to a northbound exit and southbound entrance with Kerlin Street. The freeway narrows to six lanes and continues closely parallel to the railroad tracks, crossing Chester Creek into the borough of Upland and passing to the southeast of the former Crozer-Chester Medical Center on the other side of the railroad. I-95 heads into Chester once again and comes to an interchange with PA 320 and PA 352 as it and the CSX Transportation rail line pass under several city streets. Following this, the freeway curves northeast near urban neighborhoods and crosses Ridley Creek into Ridley Township. Here, the roadway comes to a directional T interchange with the southern terminus of I-476 in the community of Woodlyn, where it also passes over Crum Creek. Past this interchange, I-95 widens to eight lanes and turns to the east away from the CSX Transportation line, passing near residential and commercial development and coming to bridges over US 13 without access and Amtrak's Northeast Corridor railroad line. The road curves east-northeast and enters the southern edge of the borough of Ridley Park, running to the north of Boeing Defense, Space & Security's Vertical Lift helicopter plant. The freeway heads back into Ridley Township as it reaches a diamond interchange with Stewart Avenue that serves Ridley Park. Past this interchange, the highway curves southeast before coming to a bridge over Darby Creek, at which point it enters Tinicum Township. I-95 turns to the east-northeast and passes between the creek to the north and commercial development to the south. The freeway comes to a cloverleaf interchange with PA 420 north of the community of Essington, where the right-most lanes in each direction serve as collector–distributor roads for the interchange. Past this interchange, the eight-lane freeway continues between marshland in the John Heinz National Wildlife Refuge at Tinicum to the north and developed areas to the south. I-95 heads north of an office park before it reaches a northbound ramp that connects to eastbound PA 291. Past this, the freeway comes to a bridge over Conrail Shared Assets Operations' (CSAO) Chester Secondary railroad line and PA 291 (Bartram Avenue).

=== Philadelphia County ===
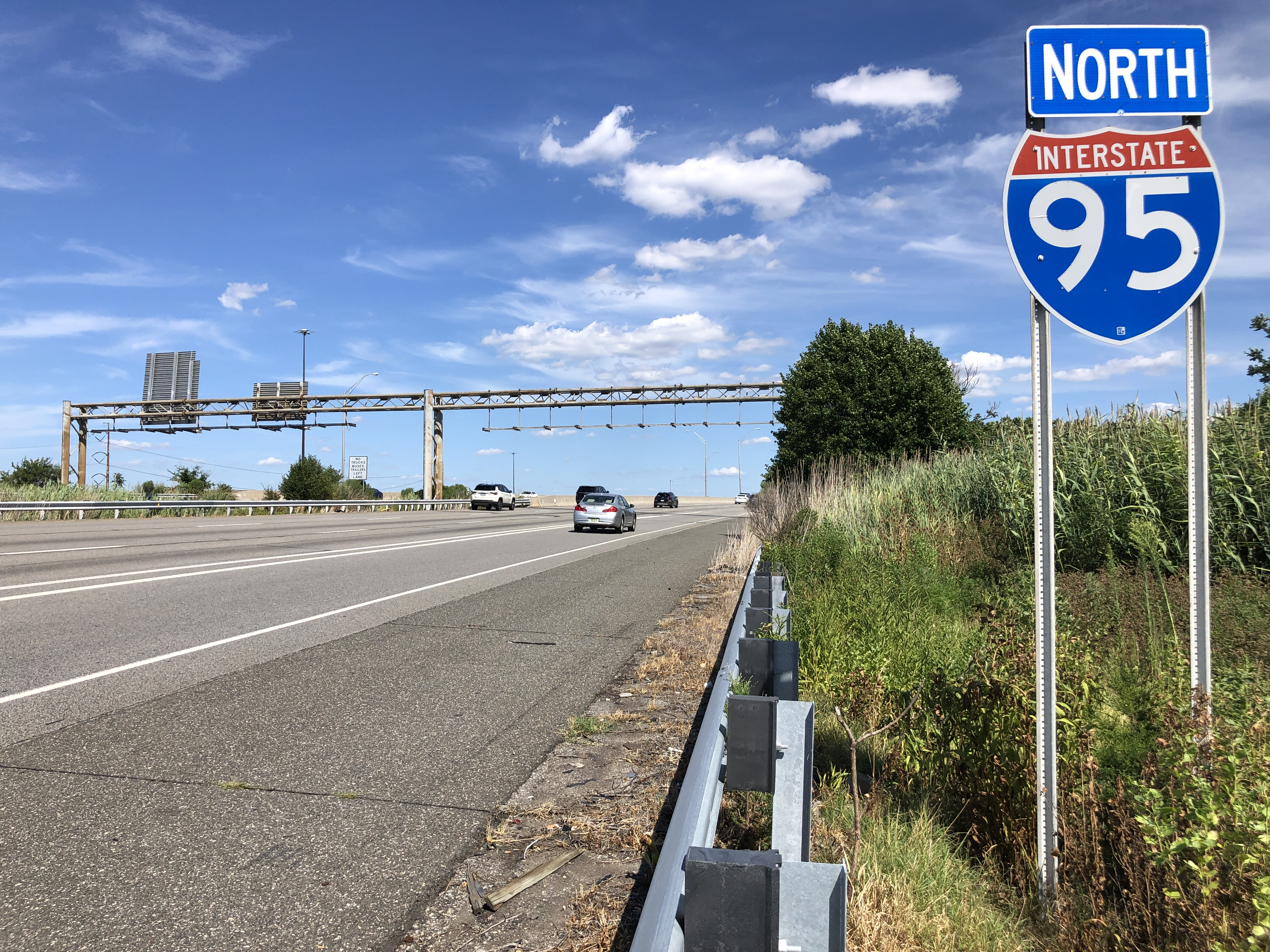
I-95 northbound past the PA 291 (Island Avenue) interchange near the Philadelphia International Airport in Philadelphia

I-95 crosses into the city of Philadelphia in Philadelphia County, at which point it heads to the northwest of the Philadelphia International Airport. The freeway passes under a ramp to the airport's departures terminal and SEPTA's Airport Line as it comes to the northbound exit for the Philadelphia International Airport terminals and a southbound entrance from PA 291 (Bartram Avenue). The road crosses under a ramp to the airport's arrivals terminal and turns to the northeast, reaching a southbound entrance from the airport terminals. The freeway passes under the northbound ramp to the airport terminals and reaches a northbound exit to PA 291 and a southbound entrance from PA 291 as it crosses under the ramp from the airport terminals to southbound I-95. At this point, I-95 gains collector–distributor roads on each side, carrying a 3–3–3–3 lane configuration. The road comes to a southbound exit to the Philadelphia International Airport terminals and PA 291 (Bartram Avenue) and a northbound entrance from the airport terminals. The freeway passes over PA 291 (Island Avenue), where a ramp connects from northbound I-95 to PA 291 and from PA 291 to southbound I-95. I-95 turns east and the collector–distributor roads end, with the roadway becoming eight lanes wide. The road comes to a bridge over PA 291 (Penrose Avenue), where there is a ramp from southbound PA 291 to southbound I-95 and a southbound exit and northbound entrance serving Bartram and Essington avenues. From here, the freeway turns southeast and heads through industrial areas, coming to a southbound exit and northbound entrance with Enterprise and Island avenues, where it also passes over CSAO's 60th Street Industrial Track line. The road narrows to six lanes and curves to the northeast, crossing the Schuylkill River on the Girard Point Bridge, a double-decker cantilever truss bridge.

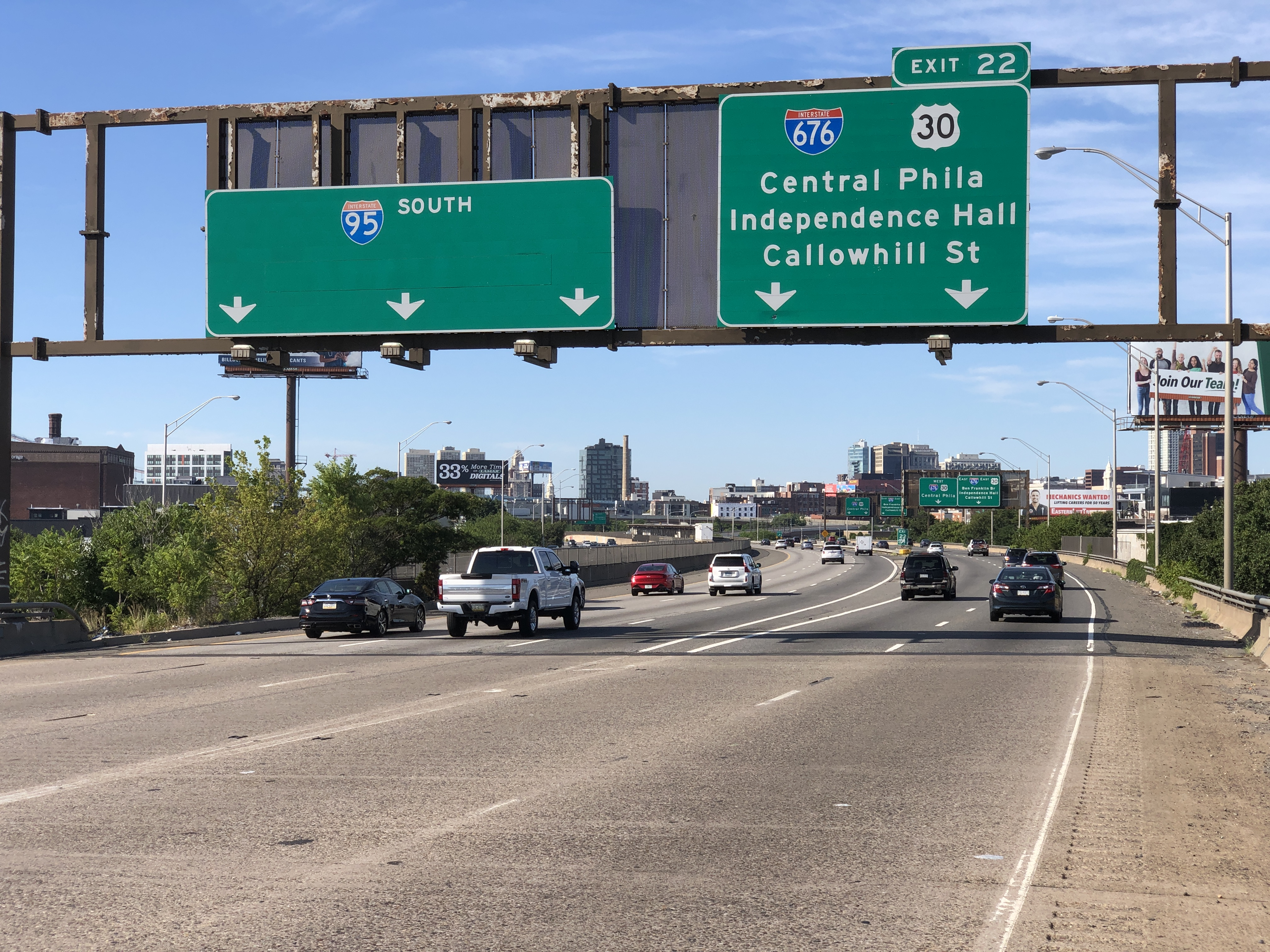
I-95 southbound approaching the I-676/US 30 interchange in Center City Philadelphia

Past the Schuylkill River, I-95 continues east into South Philadelphia as an elevated freeway through industrial areas to the north of The Navy Yard, a mixed-use development that is located at the former Philadelphia Naval Shipyard. The road passes over CSX Transportation's Harrisburg Subdivision railroad line and heads between Franklin Delano Roosevelt Park to the north and the parallel railroad tracks and The Navy Yard to the south, coming to an interchange with the southern terminus of PA 611 at Broad Street. Past this interchange, the freeway runs between the South Philadelphia Sports Complex to the north and CSX Transportation's Greenwich Yard to the south. I-95 continues east past warehouses to the north and the railroad yard to the south before making a turn to the north, running to the west of CSAO's Swanson Street Industrial Track line and the Port of Philadelphia. The road comes to an interchange connecting to eastbound I-76 (Schuylkill Expressway), which leads to the Walt Whitman Bridge over the Delaware River, and Packer Avenue. The freeway passes under the Walt Whitman Bridge carrying I-76 at this interchange. Past this interchange, I-95 widens to eight lanes and becomes an elevated roadway, running between urban residential areas to the west and commercial areas to the east. Farther north, the freeway comes to an interchange connecting to Christopher Columbus Boulevard and Washington Avenue east of the Queen Village and Society Hill neighborhoods, where it briefly narrows to seven lanes, with three northbound lanes and four southbound lanes, and returns to ground level. Following this, I-95 becomes eight lanes again and passes through the eastern part of Center City. The freeway heads between the Old City neighborhood to the west and Penn's Landing along the Delaware River to the east, where it lowers to a depressed level and passes under two freeway lids. Along this stretch, the road crosses under several city streets including Walnut, Chestnut, and Market streets. I-95 passes under the Benjamin Franklin Bridge, which carries I-676/US 30 and the PATCO Speedline over the Delaware River, before it comes to an interchange connecting to I-676/US 30 (Vine Street Expressway) along with Callowhill Street.

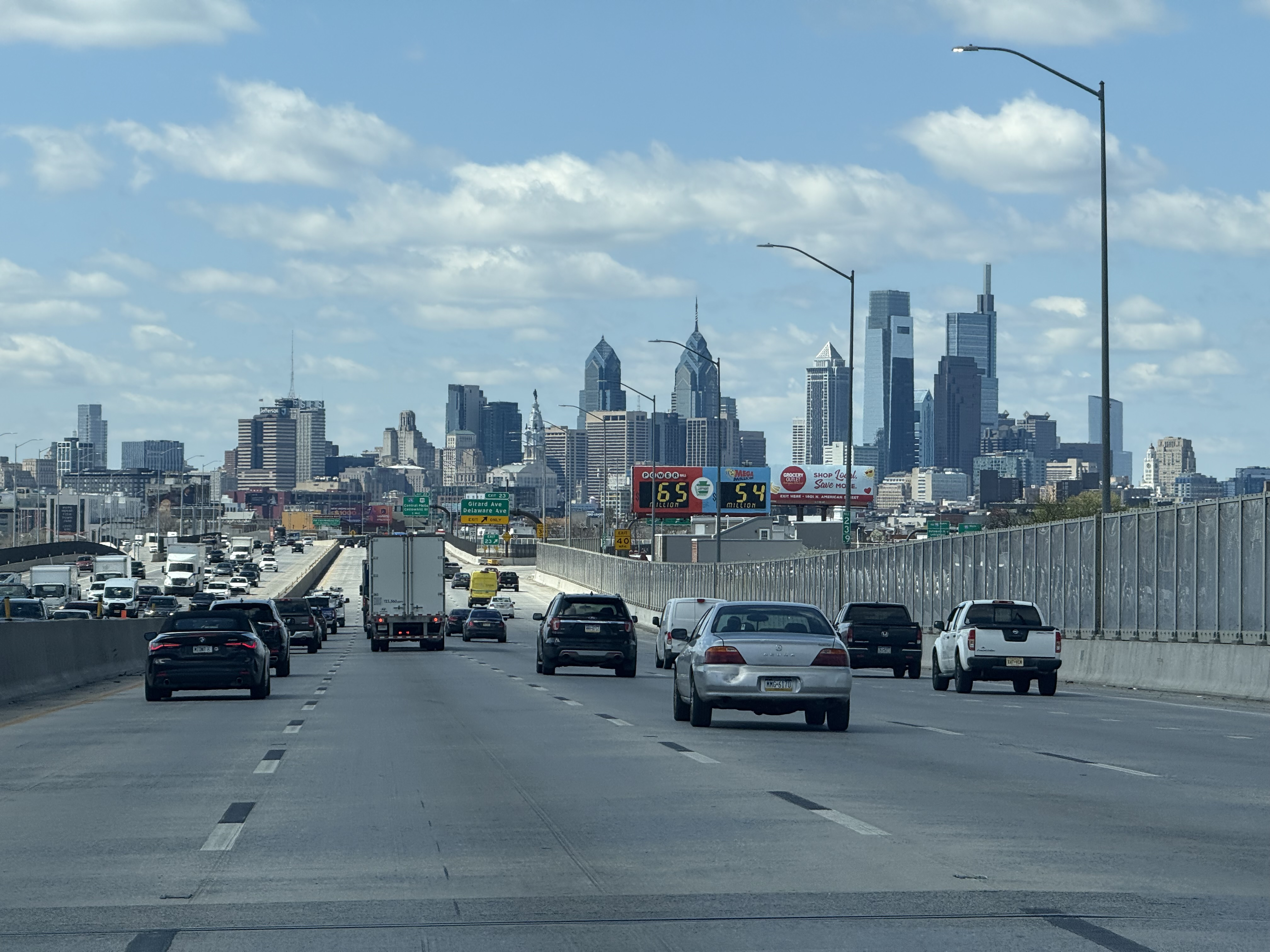
I-95 southbound approaching Center City Philadelphia

North of Center City Philadelphia, SEPTA's Market–Frankford Line rises from the Market Street subway into I-95's median as the highway returns to an elevated alignment, with the SEPTA line entering Spring Garden station before diverging from the median of I-95. From here, I-95 curves to the northeast and passes near urban residential and commercial areas in the Fishtown neighborhood, coming to an interchange that serves Girard, Lehigh, and Delaware avenues. The freeway heads into the Port Richmond neighborhood and runs between development to the northwest and an empty lot along the Delaware River to the southeast, crossing over CSAO's Richmond Industrial Track line on a bridge. The road continues between residential areas to the northwest and industrial areas to the southeast as it reaches a full interchange at Allegheny Avenue and a northbound entrance from Castor Avenue. I-95 passes under railroad tracks carrying NJ Transit's Atlantic City Line and CSAO's Delair Branch and crosses Frankford Creek as it comes to a stack interchange serving the Betsy Ross Bridge, which crosses the Delaware River and connects to the Route 90 freeway in New Jersey, and Aramingo Avenue. From here, the freeway heads into Northeast Philadelphia, passing north of the Bridesburg neighborhood and reaching a partial interchange with Bridge Street and Harbison Avenue; this interchange does not have a northbound exit. The road curves to the east-northeast and runs near urban residential and industrial development, with Amtrak's Northeast Corridor becoming closely parallel with the road to the northwest. I-95 passes northwest of the Tacony–Palmyra Bridge over the Delaware River in the Tacony neighborhood and comes to an interchange with PA 73 (Cottman Avenue) and Rhawn Street, with PA 73 providing a connection to the Tacony–Palmyra Bridge. Past this interchange, the freeway heads further from the railroad tracks and runs through industrial areas in the Holmesburg neighborhood, passing over a CSAO railroad spur at Bleigh Avenue and crossing over the Pennypack Trail and the Pennypack Creek within Pennypack Park. The road closely parallels Amtrak's Northeast Corridor again as it runs near more commercial development. I-95 comes to a bridge over the Amtrak line and reaches an interchange with Academy Road and Linden Avenue. After this interchange, the freeway narrows to six lanes and passes between residential areas to the northwest and Amtrak's Northeast Corridor to the southeast.

=== Bucks County ===
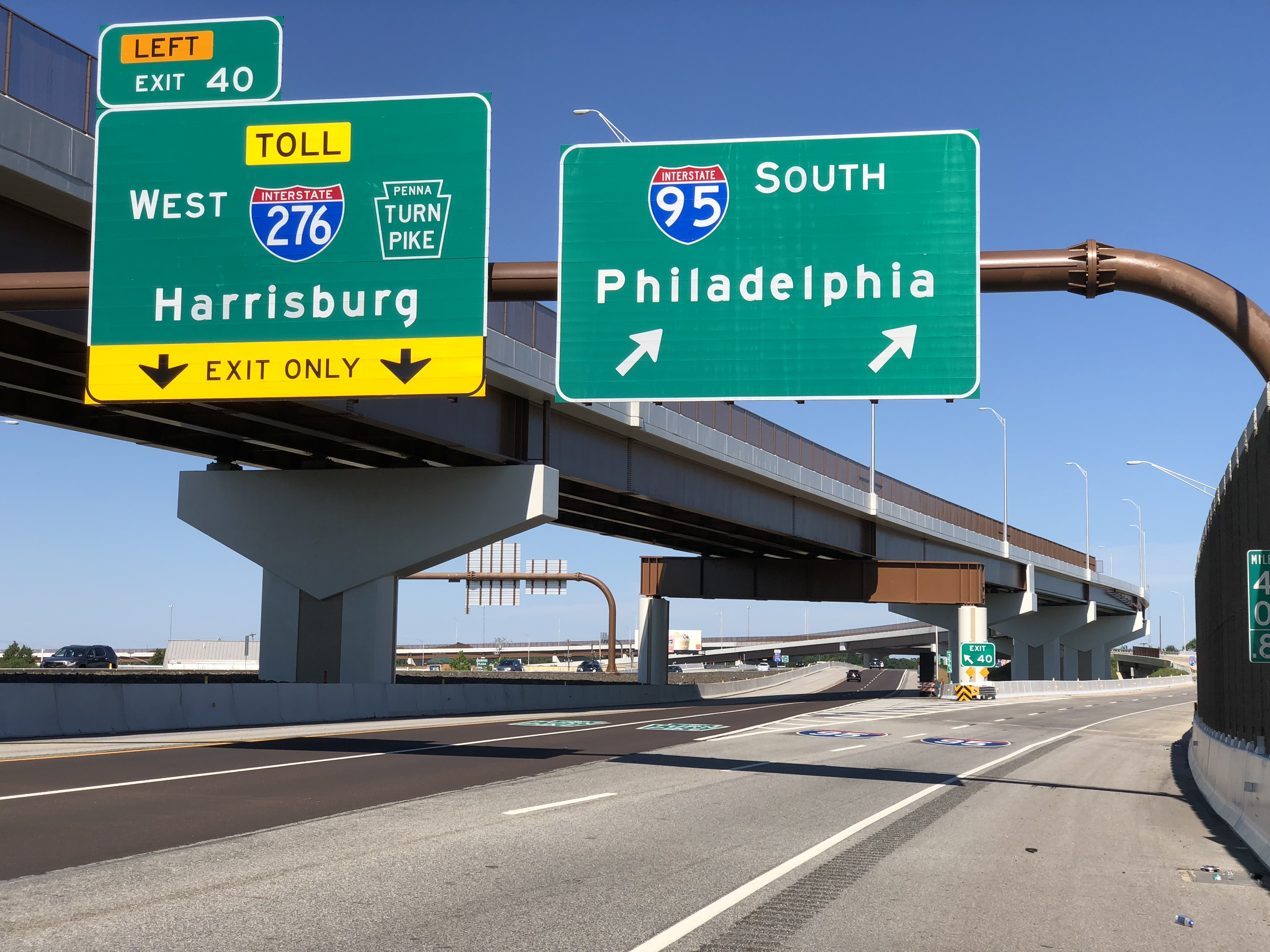
I-95 southbound at left exit for I-276 (Pennsylvania Turnpike) westbound in Bristol Township

Upon crossing Poquessing Creek, I-95 enters Bensalem Township in Bucks County and continues northeast parallel to the Amtrak line past suburban residential areas and some commercial development in the community of Andalusia. The freeway comes to a trumpet interchange with the eastern terminus of PA 63, which heads northwest on the Woodhaven Road freeway into Northeast Philadelphia and provides access to the Franklin Mall. Past this interchange, I-95 passes northwest of a park and ride lot at Cornwells Heights station on Amtrak's Northeast Corridor and SEPTA's Trenton Line, with a southbound exit and northbound entrance serving the park-and-ride lot at the train station. The road continues alongside the railroad tracks through developed suburban areas in the community of Cornwells Heights. I-95 reaches a diamond interchange with the eastern terminus of PA 132 at Street Road before the Amtrak line splits to the east and the highway comes to a bridge over US 13 with no access. The freeway passes near wooded residential neighborhoods before it crosses Neshaminy Creek, at which point it heads into Bristol Township.

Upon crossing into Bristol Township, I-95 comes to a directional T interchange with a short freeway stub connecting to PA 413 north of the borough of Bristol. From here, the freeway curves north and passes near industrial parks. I-95 reaches a partial interchange with the terminus of I-295, which continues north (east) along the Delaware Expressway, and the eastern terminus of I-276, which follows the Pennsylvania Turnpike. At this interchange, I-95 travels on flyover ramps to connect to the eastbound turnpike. This interchange has a northbound exit and southbound entrance with I-295 and a southbound exit and northbound entrance with I-276. Following this interchange, I-95 passes over PA 413 and heads east along the four-lane Pennsylvania Turnpike, although I-95 is not signed as part of the turnpike. The route runs through wooded areas with nearby development. Farther east, the road crosses Mill Creek and reaches a trumpet interchange connecting to US 13. Past this interchange, I-95 passes over an East Penn Railroad line and comes to the southbound all-electronic Delaware River Bridge toll gantry, where tolls can be paid with E-ZPass or toll by plate at highway speeds. From here, I-95 heads onto the Delaware River–Turnpike Toll Bridge, a through arch bridge, passing over US 13, the Delaware Canal, and Amtrak's Northeast Corridor before crossing the Delaware River. At this point, the Pennsylvania Turnpike ends and I-95 continues east (north) into New Jersey as the Pearl Harbor Memorial Extension of the New Jersey Turnpike, which connects to the mainline of the New Jersey Turnpike.

== History ==
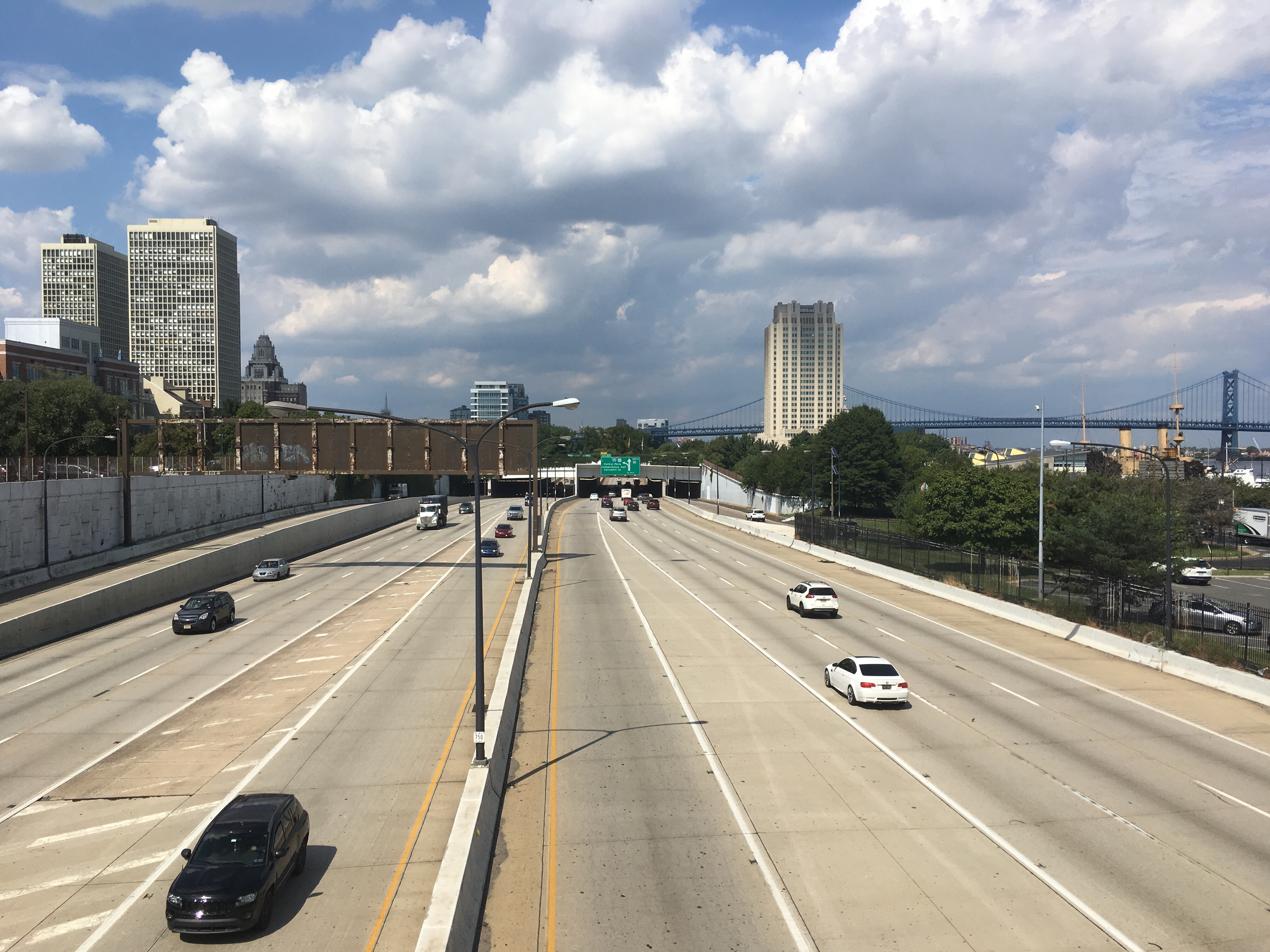
I-95 northbound approaching the I-676/US 30 interchange in Center City Philadelphia

Plans for a limited-access highway along the Delaware River originated in 1932 as part of a proposed cars-only parkway system for the Philadelphia area similar to the contemporary system being built in New York City. Planning for the proposed parkway system stalled and the plan was eventually abandoned. In 1937, plans for the highway were revived as the "Delaware Skyway", a planned elevated highway along the waterfront similar in design to the West Side Highway in New York City, though these plans were also scrapped due to concerns that the supports would hinder access to port operations on the waterfront.

In 1945, the city approved the current routing as the Delaware Expressway, envisioned to link all the industrial areas along the river with the Industrial Highway and the Trenton–Morrisville Toll Bridge to New Jersey. The proposed highway was incorporated into the Pennsylvania Turnpike system and was planned to be built as a toll road. With the advent of the Interstate Highway System in 1956, the project was turned over to the Pennsylvania Department of Highways and incorporated into I-95. Construction on the road commenced in 1959.

Original plans called for the freeway to follow the US 13 corridor to the Trenton–Morrisville Toll Bridge, where I-95 would continue north along the current Trenton Freeway (US 1). Due to limited capacity of the highway through Trenton, planners instead opted to build a new alignment bypassing Trenton to the west (current I-295), incorporating the existing Scudder Falls Bridge.

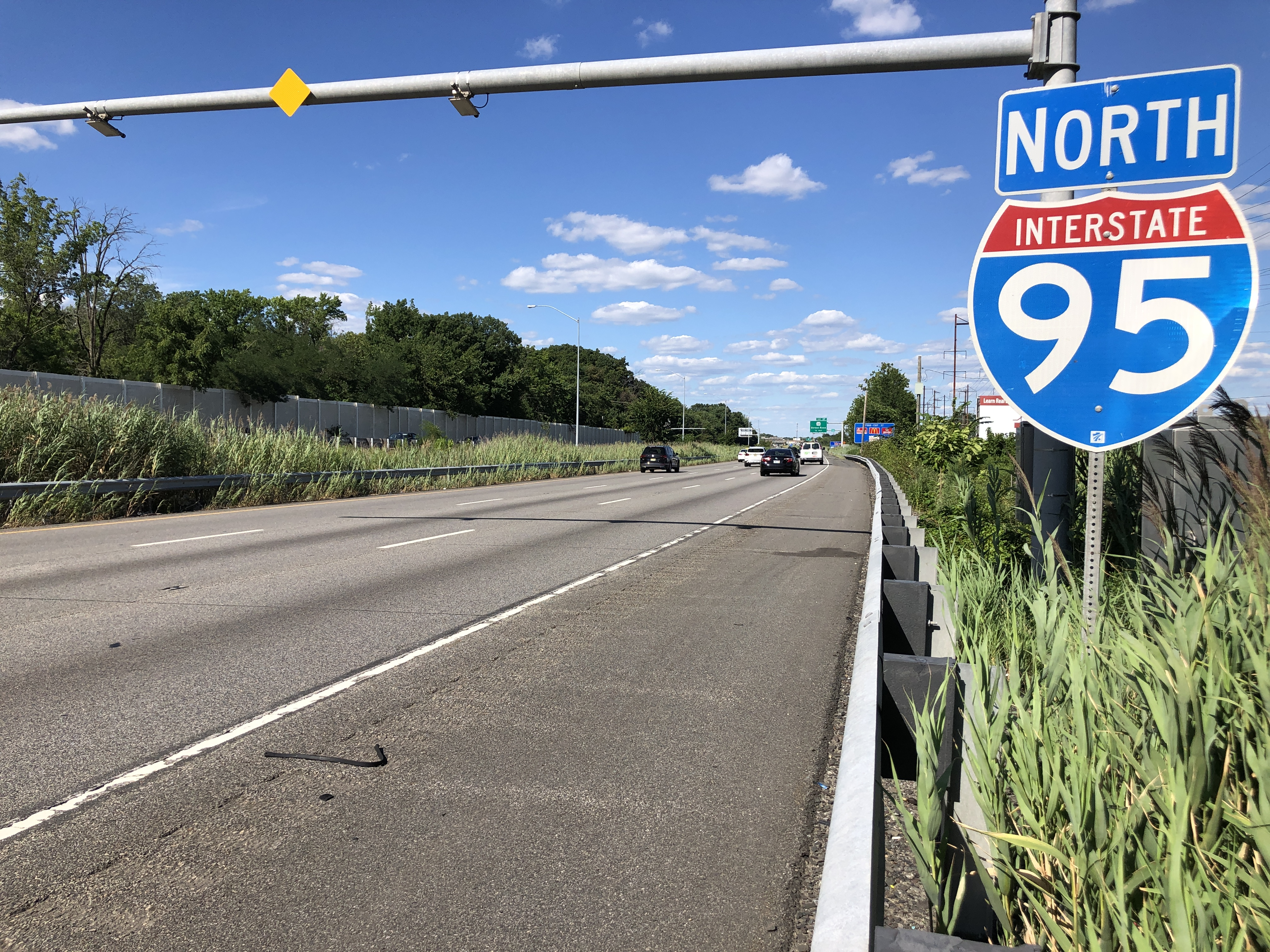
I-95 northbound past the PA 63 interchange in Bensalem Township

Controversy erupted in the early 1960s over the planned eight-lane elevated segment of the highway along the Center City waterfront; residents of the upscale Society Hill neighborhood objected to the highway on the grounds that it would cut off the neighborhood from the river. State highway officials reached a compromise by opting for an alternative depressed design with an overhead concrete deck connecting Center City to a planned redeveloped waterfront today known as Penn's Landing. By 1979, the entire length of the freeway was open to traffic with the exception of a four-mile (6.4 km) segment near Philadelphia International Airport.

Completion of the final section of the highway faced considerable difficulty, as the road was to be built on a layer of clay separating the city's water supply from the output of its sewage treatment plant. Matters were complicated by a two-year suspension of federal highway funding while the state failed to implement a federally mandated emissions testing program. The final segment was opened to traffic in 1985, marking the completion of the 35-year project.

On March 13, 1996, a pile of tires that were illegally stored underneath I-95 in the Port Richmond neighborhood of Philadelphia caught fire. The fire burned for five hours and sent smoke that was visible from 30 miles (48 km) away, and it took 180 firefighters to bring the fire under control. The tire fire damaged the roadway, resulting in the road being closed for eight days.

As part of the construction of Terminal A-West complex at Philadelphia International Airport, new exit ramps were built connecting I-95 to the airport's passenger terminals. In July 1999, the Pennsylvania Department of Transportation (PennDOT) and several federal government agencies selected a route for the connecting ramps from I-95 to the airport; the agency tried to avoid the John Heinz National Wildlife Refuge at Tinicum. K/B Fund II, the owner of the International Plaza complex, formerly the Scott Paper Company headquarters Scott Plaza, objected to the proposed routing, saying it would interfere with International Plaza development. It entered a filing in the US Court of Appeals for the Third Circuit to challenge the proposed routing.

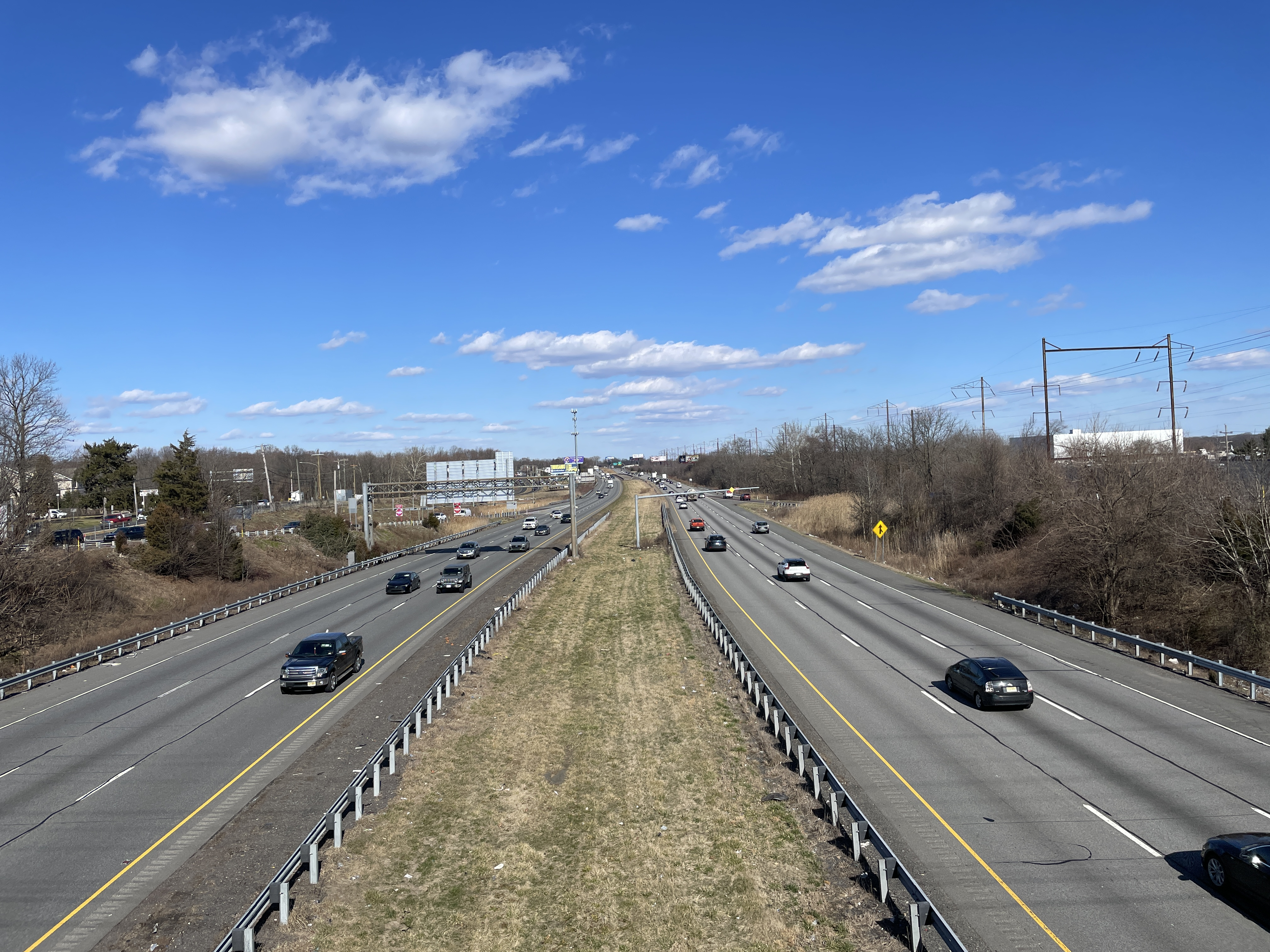
I-95 northbound at the PA 132 interchange in Bensalem Township

In 2000, the airport attempted to acquire the complex for $90 million (equivalent to $160 million in 2025) but Tinicum Township commissioners stopped the deal from going forward, citing concerns of a loss of tax revenue for the township and Interboro School District as well as noise pollution concerns. In 2002, construction took place on new entrance ramps to the airport's passenger terminals. The new ramps eliminated the traffic signal and stop intersections previously encountered by northbound I-95 motorists who had to use PA 291 to the airport.

The project consisted of six new bridges, more than 4,300 linear feet (1,300 m) of retaining walls, and 7.7 lane miles (12.4 km) of new pavement. The project also included new highway lighting, overhead sign structures, landscaping, and the paving of Bartram Avenue. Also under the project, PennDOT resurfaced I-95 between PA 420 and Island Avenue and built a truck enforcement and park-and-ride lot. A ribbon-cutting ceremony for the new ramps took place on June 28, 2002, with Governor Mark Schweiker in attendance.

On March 18, 2008, two miles (3.2 km) of I-95 within Philadelphia were closed when PennDOT discovered large cracks in a support column underneath the highway. In order to prevent possible collapse, I-95 was closed between exit 23 (Girard Avenue) and exit 25 (Allegheny Avenue). PennDOT worked quickly to stiffen the support beams to allow the road to be raised off the column, using 16 jacks, early on March 20. PennDOT reopened the road shortly thereafter, and planned to replace the cracked column.

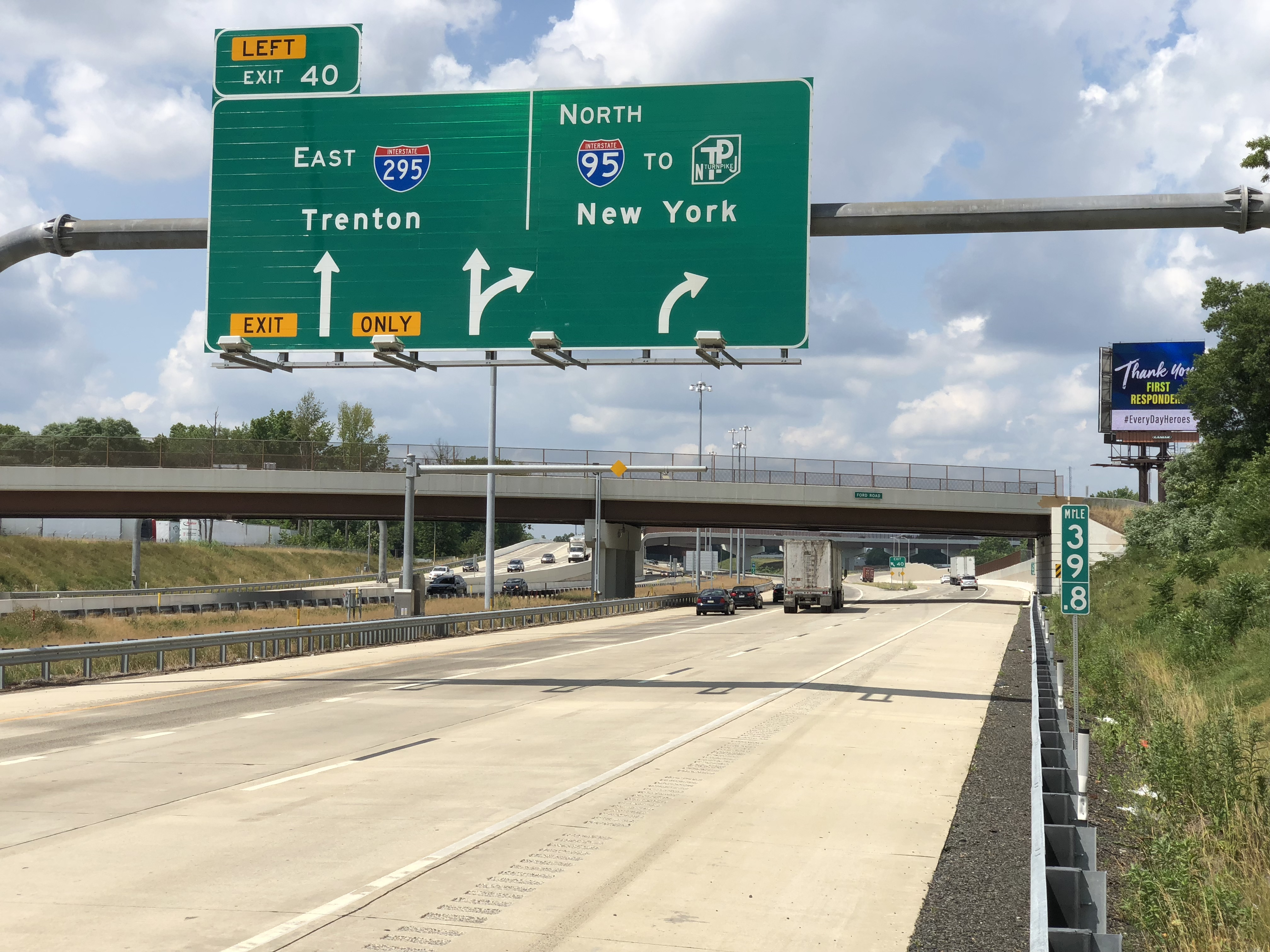
I-95 northbound at left exit for I-295 eastbound at the I-95-Pennsylvania Turnpike interchange in Bristol Township, this exit did not exist until 2018

Prior to 2018, I-95 and the Pennsylvania Turnpike (I-276) crossed with no interchange. I-276 continued east along the turnpike to the Delaware River–Turnpike Toll Bridge and I-95 continued north to the Scudder Falls Bridge. In order to remedy this and also provide a continuous route for I-95, eliminating the gap in New Jersey caused by the cancellation of the Somerset Freeway, a high-speed interchange between the two roads was built. I-95 was rerouted onto the Pennsylvania Turnpike into New Jersey toward the New Jersey Turnpike, cutting the eastern terminus of I-276 back to the interchange, and I-295 was extended into Pennsylvania along the former I-95 alignment around Trenton to end at the interchange.

Groundbreaking for the interchange took place on July 30, 2013, with Governor Tom Corbett in attendance. Construction of the first stage of the interchange, consisting only of the two high-speed flyovers carrying I-95, began in late 2014. Control cities along I-95 were updated in early 2018 in preparation for the opening of the main flyovers. From as far south as I-676/US 30 in Center City, the previous northbound control city of Trenton was replaced with New York. This continues eastward as I-95's northbound control city into New Jersey. Trenton remains the control city of eastbound I-295 (former northbound I-95) until US 1, after which it becomes Princeton. In preparation for completion of this stage, I-95 was truncated to the Taylorsville Road interchange in Lower Makefield Township in March 2018 and then truncated to the site of the interchange construction in July of the same year, with I-295 extended to replace I-95. On September 22, 2018, the flyovers opened. Signs were updated during a brief early-morning closure of the turnpike, marking the truncation of I-276 to the new interchange, removing most of the signage for the Pennsylvania Turnpike, and the extension of I-95 eastward into New Jersey, forming a continuous posted route between Miami, Florida, and the Canada–United States border at Houlton, Maine. The completion of this interchange also provided a direct freeway connection between Philadelphia and New York City.

The remaining six interchange movements have yet to begin construction due to funding constraints. Construction will begin when funding is available.

From 2018 to 2020, the newly created segment of I-95 in Bristol was widened, and the exit 42 interchange with US 13 was rebuilt into an at-grade intersection.

On April 26, 2023, the northbound exit at Bridge Street/Harbison Avenue was permanently closed.

On June 11, 2023, a gasoline tanker crashed and caught fire underneath a bridge along I-95 at the PA 73 interchange in Northeast Philadelphia, kiling the driver. This caused the northbound lanes of the highway to collapse and damaged the southbound lanes, resulting in the closure of the roadway between the Betsy Ross Bridge/Aramingo Avenue and PA 63 (Woodhaven Road) interchanges. Traffic was detoured around the closure along I-676/US 30 (Vine Street Expressway), I-76 (Schuylkill Expressway), US 1 (Roosevelt Boulevard), and PA 63 (Woodhaven Road) in addition to a local detour using streets in Northeast Philadelphia.

As a result of the closure, SEPTA added train service to the Trenton Line and added capacity to the West Trenton and Fox Chase rail lines. In addition, the Philadelphia Parking Authority allowed for free parking at three lots for commuters. Repairs to rebuild the collapse bridge could take several months. Governor Josh Shapiro issued a disaster declaration on June 12, 2023, in order to allow for federal funds to be used for repairs. A new bridge will be built to replace the collapsed bridge. The gap will be filled with backfill and a temporary roadway will be constructed while the permanent replacement bridge is built. Demolition of the damaged bridge was completed on June 15, 2023, with work on the temporary roadway beginning. I-95 reopened on June 23, 2023, with six lanes of traffic. Governor Shapiro, Philadelphia Mayor Jim Kenney, and PennDOT secretary Mike Carroll attended a ceremony marking the reopening of the highway. On November 7, 2023, the permanent northbound lanes reopened, with the permanent southbound lanes reopening on November 9, 2023. Following that, the temporary roadway was replaced with a permanent bridge. The southbound lanes of I-95 fully reopened on May 23, 2024, while the northbound lanes of I-95 fully reopened on May 24, 2024, restoring eight lanes of traffic. The ramp from northbound I-95 to PA 73 also reopened on May 24, 2024.

On April 1, 2024, a truck carrying an oversized load struck a bridge carrying a Conrail line over I-95 in Philadelphia, resulting in the closure of the northbound direction while repairs were made. Repairs were completed and the highway reopened on April 6.

== Future ==
=== 95revive project ===
PennDOT is currently in the process of completely reconstructing I-95 between I-676/US 30 and PA 73 (Cottman Avenue) in Philadelphia. This section, built in the 1960s, was nominally eight lanes but narrowed to six lanes at most interchanges. PennDOT has split the project into five individual projects or sections, starting at the interchange at PA 73 (Cottman Avenue) and ending at the Girard Avenue interchange.

==== Cottman/Princeton interchange to Levick Street ====
Phase One, with construction costing $34 million (equivalent to $47.1 million in 2025) and lasting from April 2009 to September 2012, involved construction of a new southbound onramp from State Road at Longshore Avenue, as well as a northbound onramp from Milnor Street to an existing northbound onramp from Princeton Avenue. PA 73 (Cottman Avenue) and State Road were widened, and Princeton Avenue was converted from a one-way eastbound street to a two-way street.

Phase Two, with construction costing $212.3 million (equivalent to $274 million in 2025) and lasting from November 2012 to 2017, involved reconstruction of seven bridges between Bleigh Avenue and Levick Street along I-95. New retaining walls next to I-95 and a new water main and sewer culvert along Wissinoming Street were built.

Phase Three began in 2021 and ended in 2023, and will include the construction of a new ramp from PA 73 (Cottman Avenue) onto I-95 southbound, an associated retaining wall, and the relocation of Wissinoming Street between Princeton Avenue and Wellington Street. The cost is unknown.

==== Levick Street to Bridge Street interchange ====
This project, split into four phases, involves reconstructing I-95 and its bridges to provide four lanes each way from the Levick Street overpass to the Bridge Street interchange, along with the extension of Delaware Avenue from Buckius Street to Tacony Street.

==== Bridge Street interchange to Betsy Ross Bridge interchange ====
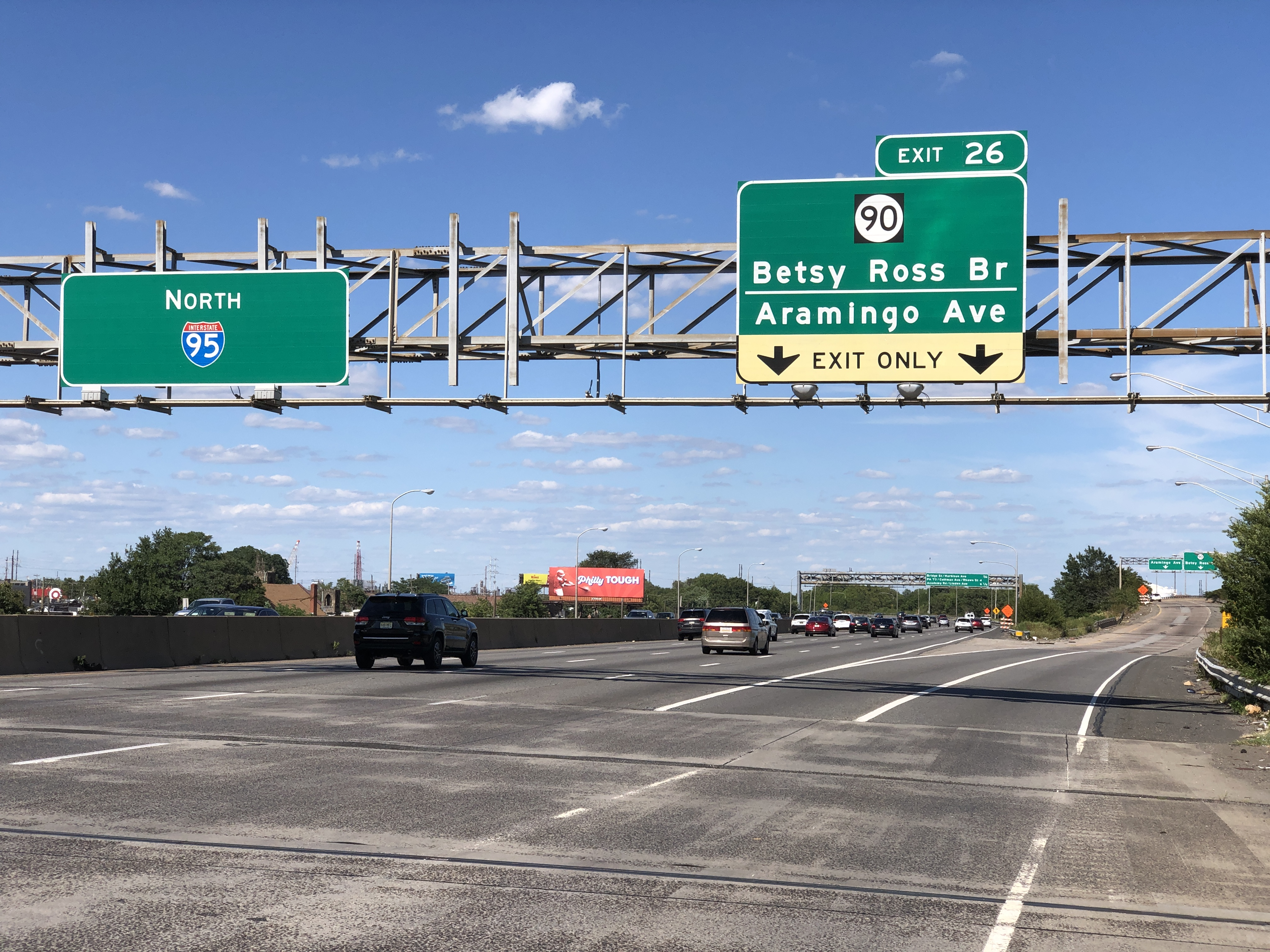
I-95 northbound at the Betsy Ross Bridge/Aramingo Avenue interchange in Northeast Philadelphia

This project, split into six phases, included widening and reconstructing I-95 and its bridges from Wheatsheaf Lane through the Betsy Ross Bridge interchange to Margaret Street. The first phase was completed in late 2017, with construction starting in March 2015, at a cost of $160.3 million (equivalent to $207 million in 2025); it included widening ramps and constructing new ramps involving I-95, Aramingo Avenue, and the Betsy Ross Bridge. The second phase started in January 2017 and was completed in 2020 at a cost of $81 million; this involved building new ramps from Aramingo Avenue to I-95 and opening the ramps from Aramingo Avenue to and from the Betsy Ross Bridge.

==== Ann Street to Frankford Creek ====
This project, split into four phases, includes reconstructing I-95 from the Betsy Ross Bridge to the Allegheny Avenue ramps and improving the interchange at Allegheny Avenue/Castor Avenue. Already, Richmond Street was widened and had new curbs, sidewalks, and traffic signals installed and trees planted, which, along with other improvements, cost $32.1 million.

==== Girard Avenue interchange to Allegheny/Castor interchange ====
This project, including seven phases, includes reconstructing I-95 between the Girard Avenue interchange through the Allegheny Avenue/Castor Avenue interchange to the I-676/US 30 interchange at Race Street. I-95 between Palmer Street and Frankford Avenue has already been rebuilt and improved upon, and an I-95 viaduct between Palmer and Ann streets has been rebuilt.

In addition to reconfiguring the interchanges, the road will be widened, resulting in I-95 being at least eight lanes wide between I-676/US 30 and Academy Road. The entire project's tentative completion date is around 2026.

=== Relocation in Philadelphia ===
Some have proposed removing the freeway, thereby allowing Philadelphians better access to the Delaware River. On December 31, 2015, Philadelphia Mayor Michael Nutter announced that a $10-million (equivalent to $13.3 million in 2025) study funded by state and federal money would consider placing I-95 in a tunnel in the area around Penn's Landing.

A four-acre (1.6 ha) "overcap park" will cover approximately 0.1 miles (0.16 km) of the highway. The park is expected to have spray pools, a skating rink, and a cafe. The park is to slope down to the riverfront, expanding the Penn's Landing promenade and connecting it to Old City. Construction on the park began in 2023. The project is expected to be completed in 2026.

== Exit list ==
County	Location	mi	km	Old exit	New exit	Destinations	Notes
Delaware	Lower Chichester Township	0.000	0.000			I-95 south / I-495 south / DE 92 – Wilmington	Continuation into Delaware
Delaware	Lower Chichester Township	0.598	0.962	Welcome center and weigh station (northbound only)			
Delaware	Upper Chichester Township	1.157	1.862		1	Chichester Avenue	
Delaware	Upper Chichester Township	1.679	2.702		2	PA 452 (Market Street) to US 322 west	US 322 not signed southbound; access to Neumann University
Delaware	Chester	2.919	4.698		3A	US 322 west – West Chester	Southbound exit and northbound entrance; southern end of US 322 concurrency
Delaware	Chester	3.003	4.833		3B	Highland Avenue	Signed as exit 3 northbound
Delaware	Chester Township	3.788	6.096		4	US 322 east to PA 291 – Commodore Barry Bridge, New Jersey	Northern end of US 322 concurrency; access to Chester Waterfront, Harrah's Philadelphia, and Subaru Park
Delaware	Chester	4.651	7.485		5	Kerlin Street	Northbound exit and southbound entrance
Delaware	Chester	5.412	8.710		6	PA 320 (Providence Avenue) / PA 352 (Edgmont Avenue / Avenue of the States)	Signed for Providence Avenue southbound, Avenue of the States northbound
Delaware	Ridley Township	6.636	10.680		7	I-476 north – Plymouth Meeting	Southern terminus of I-476
Delaware	Ridley Township	7.755	12.480		8	Ridley Park	Access via Stewart Avenue; access to Penn Terminals and Chester Waterfront
Delaware	Tinicum Township	8.984	14.458		9	PA 420 – Essington, Prospect Park	Signed as exits 9A (PA 420 south) and 9B (PA 420 north)
Delaware	Tinicum Township	10.253	16.501		10 (NB); 12B (SB)	PA 291 (Bartram Avenue) – Cargo City	No northbound entrance; Bartram Avenue not signed southbound; access to John Heinz National Wildlife Refuge at Tinicum
Philadelphia	Philadelphia	11.561	18.606		12A	Philadelphia International Airport	Signed as exit 12 northbound; access to Philadelphia International Airport Cell Phone Waiting Lot
Philadelphia	Philadelphia	13.076	21.044		13	PA 291 (Island Avenue) to I-76 west – Valley Forge	Northbound exit and southbound entrance
Philadelphia	Philadelphia	13.980	22.499		14	Bartram Avenue / Essington Avenue	Southbound exit and northbound entrance; access to John Heinz National Wildlife Refuge at Tinicum
Philadelphia	Philadelphia	14.424	23.213		15	Enterprise Avenue / Island Avenue	Southbound exit and northbound entrance
Philadelphia	Philadelphia			Girard Point Bridge over the Schuylkill River			
Philadelphia	Philadelphia	16.495	26.546		17	PA 611 north (Broad Street) / Pattison Avenue	Southern terminus of PA 611; access to Sports Complex and The Navy Yard
Philadelphia	Philadelphia	18.534	29.828		19	I-76 east (Walt Whitman Bridge) / Packer Avenue	Exit 351 on I-76
Philadelphia	Philadelphia	19.964	32.129		20	Columbus Boulevard / Washington Avenue	Access to Penn's Landing
Philadelphia	Philadelphia	21.943	35.314		22	I-676 west / US 30 west / Callowhill Street – Central Philadelphia, Independence Hall	Access via Vine Street Expressway; access to Benjamin Franklin Bridge and Pennsylvania Convention Center
Philadelphia	Philadelphia	22.972	36.970		23	Girard Avenue / Delaware Avenue	
Philadelphia	Philadelphia	24.793	39.900		25	Allegheny Avenue / Castor Avenue	
Philadelphia	Philadelphia	25.361	40.815		26	Betsy Ross Bridge / Aramingo Avenue to Route 90 east	
Philadelphia	Philadelphia	26.320	42.358		27	Bridge Street / Harbison Avenue	Southbound exit and northbound entrance
Philadelphia	Philadelphia	29.523	47.513		30	PA 73 (Cottman Avenue)	Access to Tacony–Palmyra Bridge
Philadelphia	Philadelphia	32.091	51.645		32	Academy Road / Linden Avenue	Access to Northeast Philadelphia Airport and Holy Family University
Bucks	Bensalem Township	34.704	55.851		35	PA 63 west (Woodhaven Road)	Eastern terminus of PA 63
Bucks	Bensalem Township	35.228	56.694		—	Cornwells Heights Park & Ride	Southbound exit and northbound entrance
Bucks	Bensalem Township	36.396	58.574		37	PA 132 west (Street Road) to US 13 (Bristol Pike)	US 13/Bristol Pike not signed northbound; eastern terminus of PA 132; access to Parx Casino and Racing and Neshaminy State Park
Bucks	Bristol Township	39.298	63.244	40	39	PA 413 – Bristol	Access to Burlington–Bristol Bridge
Bucks	Bristol Township	40.689	65.483		40	I-295 east – Trenton	Northbound exit and southbound entrance; western terminus of I-295; former routing of I-95
Bucks	Bristol Township	40.689	65.483		40	I-276 Toll west / Penna Turnpike west – Harrisburg	Southbound exit and northbound entrance; southern end of unsigned Penna Turnpike concurrency; eastern terminus of I-276
Bucks	Bristol Township	43.00	69.20	29; 358	42	US 13 – Levittown, Bristol	Delaware Valley Interchange; access to Pennsbury Manor and Washington Crossing
Delaware River		43.4	69.8	Delaware River–Turnpike Toll Bridge (southbound toll; E-ZPass or toll-by-plate)			
Delaware River		43.4	69.8			I-95 north / Pearl Harbor Extension east to N.J. Turnpike – New York Penna Turnpike ends	Continuation into New Jersey; unsigned eastern terminus of Penna Turnpike
1.000 mi = 1.609 km; 1.000 km = 0.621 mi: Concurrency terminus; Electronic toll collection; Incomplete access

== See also ==
Interstate 95
Previous state: Delaware	Pennsylvania	Next state: New Jersey
