= Washington Avenue Historic District (Philadelphia) =

Historic district in Pennsylvania, United States

- Washington Avenue Historic District (Washington Avenue Factory District)
- U.S. National Register of Historic Places
- U.S. Historic district
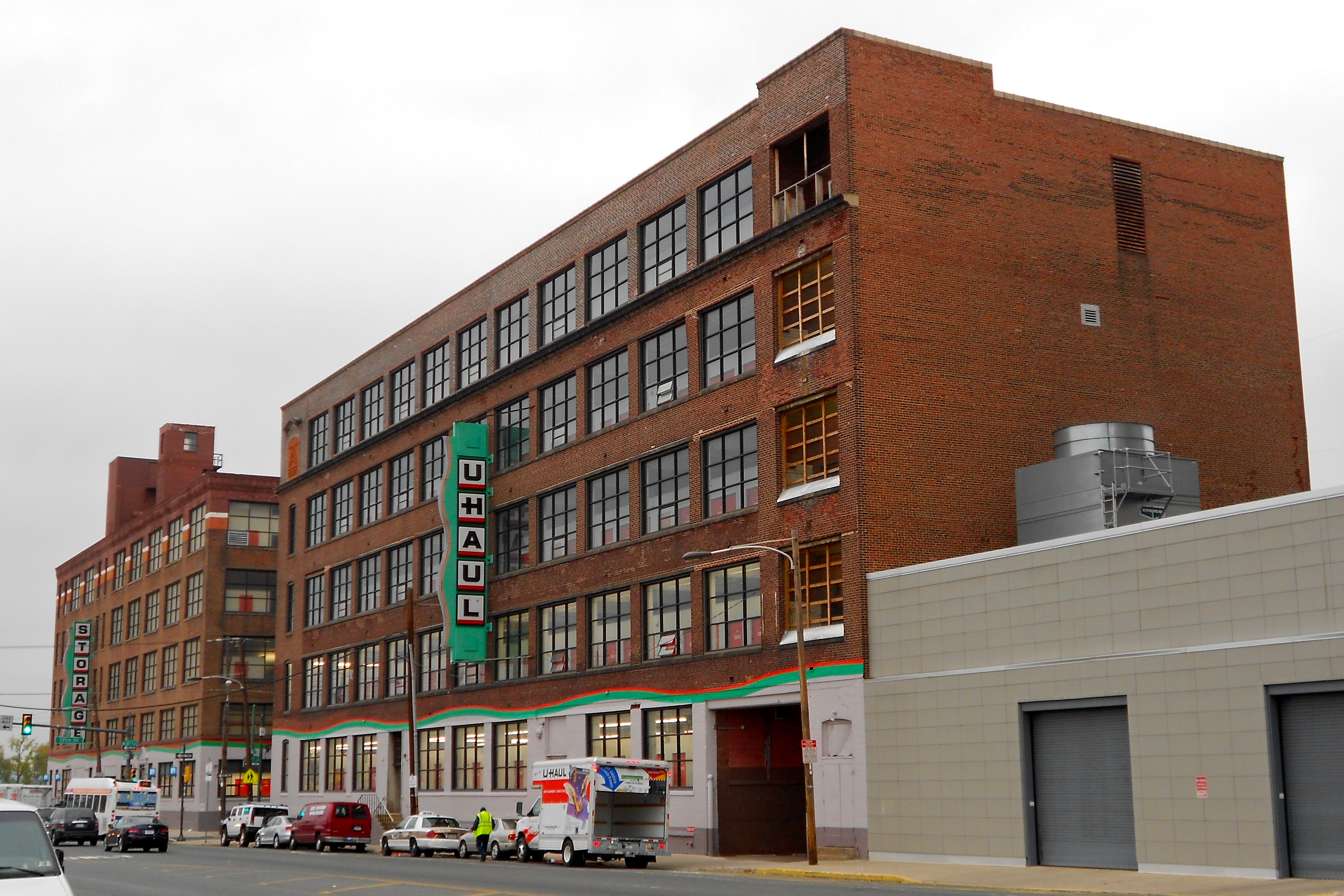
- 1135 and 1201 Washington

- Location within Philadelphia Location within Pennsylvania Location within the United States
- Location: Roughly bounded by Carpenter, Washington, 10th, and Broad Sts., Philadelphia, Pennsylvania
- Coordinates: 39°56′17″N 75°9′44″W
- Area: 16 acres (6.5 ha)
- Built: 1889
- Architect: Multiple
- NRHP reference No.: 84003561
- Added to NRHP: September 7, 1984

Washington Avenue
- Interactive map of Washington Avenue
- Location: Philadelphia
- West end: Grays Ferry Avenue in South Philadelphia
- Major junctions: PA 611 (Broad Street) in South Philadelphia; Front Street in South Philadelphia
- East end: Christopher Columbus Boulevard in South Philadelphia

Washington Avenue Historic District, or Washington Avenue Factory District, is a national historic district located in the Hawthorne and Bella Vista neighborhoods of South Philadelphia, Pennsylvania. It comprises the remaining four blocks of one of the last industrial neighborhoods in Philadelphia, and encompasses eight contributing buildings built between 1889 and 1927:

- 1001 Washington Avenue: C. J . Milne Factory
- 1101 Washington Avenue: Curtis Publishing Company
- 1135 Washington Avenue: American Cigar Company
- 1201 Washington Avenue: John Wyeth Chemical Works
- 1301 Washington Avenue: National Licorice Company
- 1001 S. Broad Street: John Wanamaker Clothing Factory
- 1200 Carpenter Street: John Williams and Company
- 1227 Carpenter Street: Main Belting Company

It was added to the National Register of Historic Places in 1984.

== History ==
Washington Avenue was a district of manufacturing plants and factories that was also known as the "workshop of the world" up until mid 20th century (1950s).

In 1875 the north side of the 1000 block (site of the Milne Factory) was a cemetery; the site of the Curtis Building was a lumberyard; the Wyeth sites at 10th and 12th Streets were coal yards; the Wanamaker Factory was the location of the 13th and 15th Street Passenger Railroad stables and car barn. Only the western half of the 1100 block (now American Cigar) was given over to intensive industrial development - a cotton and woolen mill in a building demolished before 1900.

Industry arrived late on Washington Avenue, though it had become a significant shipping center by the 1850s with the arrival of the Philadelphia, Wilmington and Baltimore Railroad (PW&B). These buildings were located here because of the position of the railroad tracks in the middle of Washington Avenue, connecting one factory to the next, and to the rest of the nation.

The main influx of heavy industry began with the arrival in 1889 of John Wyeth's chemical laboratory and pharmaceutical works. Ultimately the company built several other buildings near the PW&B tracks, including the handsome five-story loft building at the northwest corner of 12th and Washington in 1909.

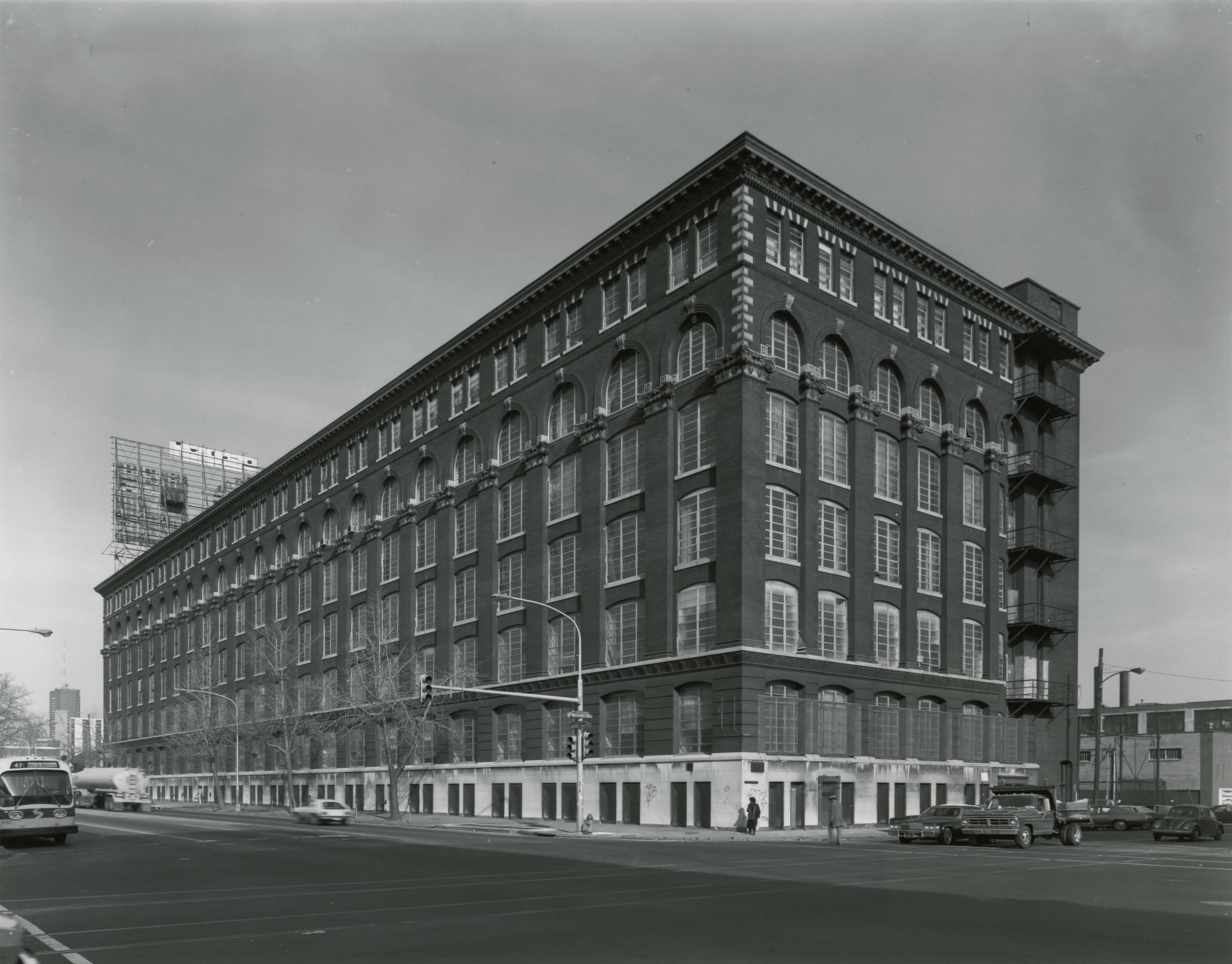
John Wanamaker Clothing Factory in 1984

In 1890, John Wanamaker built a warehouse at Broad and Carpenter to hold his goods, and ten years later he commissioned the monumental six-story factory at Broad and Washington that obliterated the earlier buildings.

Five years earlier Caleb Milne built the largest of all, a 376 foot long factory that stretched from 10th to 11th Streets.

By 1900 the John Williams Cotton and Woolen Mill occupied the 3-story brick building at Carpenter and 12th Streets, and six years later it expanded to the west end of its block in a six-story high loft.

The Main Belting Company was at its location on Carpenter Street before 1900, and was extended in 1902 and again in 1911.

On the 1100 block were the Curtis Publishing Company Warehouse and the adjacent American Cigar Company. The National Licorice Company built its modern reinforced concrete plant in 1927-28) at 13th and Washington Avenue, completing the group of industrial buildings begun thirty eight years earlier.

The overwhelming scale of these manufacturing buildings underscores their impact on their community, which provided the thousands of workers that wove cloth for John Williams and C.J. Milne, sewed garments for John Wanamaker, moved the various supplies of Curtis Publishing (which printed Ladies Home Journal and Saturday Evening Post), wrapped cigars for American Cigars, produced the chemical and pharmaceutical products of the John Wyeth Laboratories, or manufactured candy for National Licorice.

Many of the buildings are of architectural note as well. The Milne factory, for instance, by Hales and Ballinger, featured their newly invented "Superspan Truss", which shaped many of the conventional forms of factory architecture.

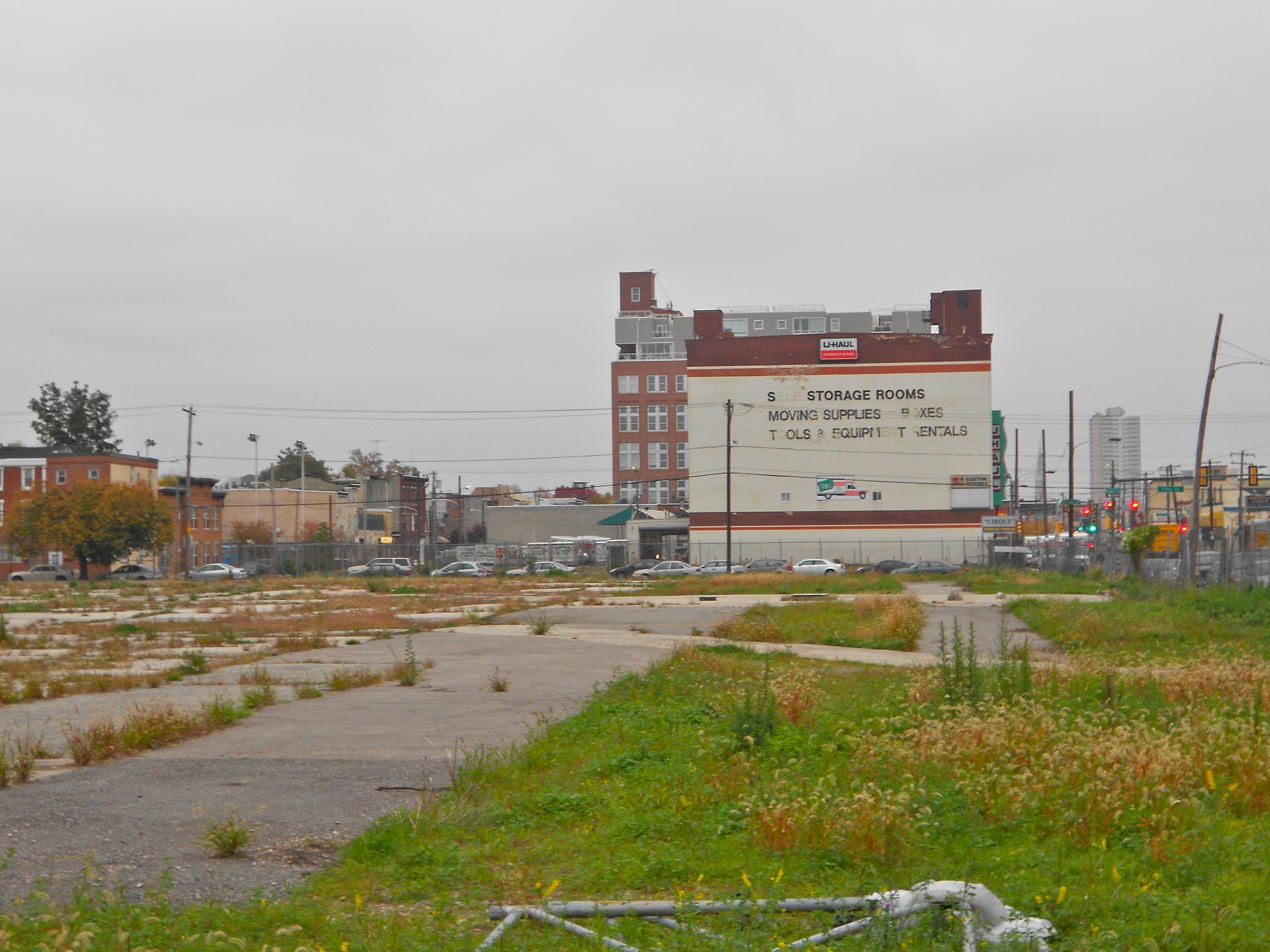
Empty lots at 1101 S. Broad and 1301 Washington where contributing buildings were located; 1201 Washington is in the background

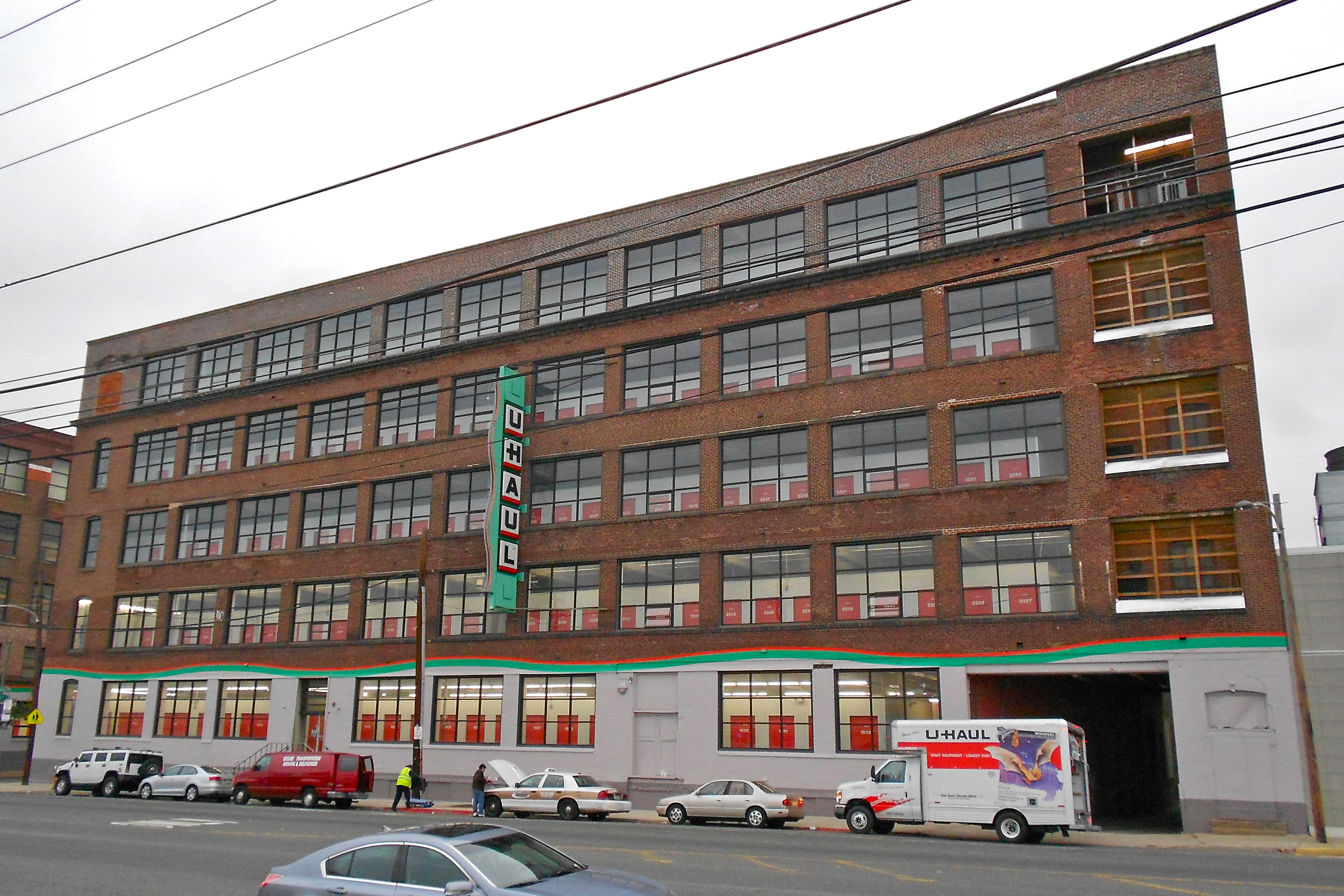
1135 Washington, formerly the American Cigar Company

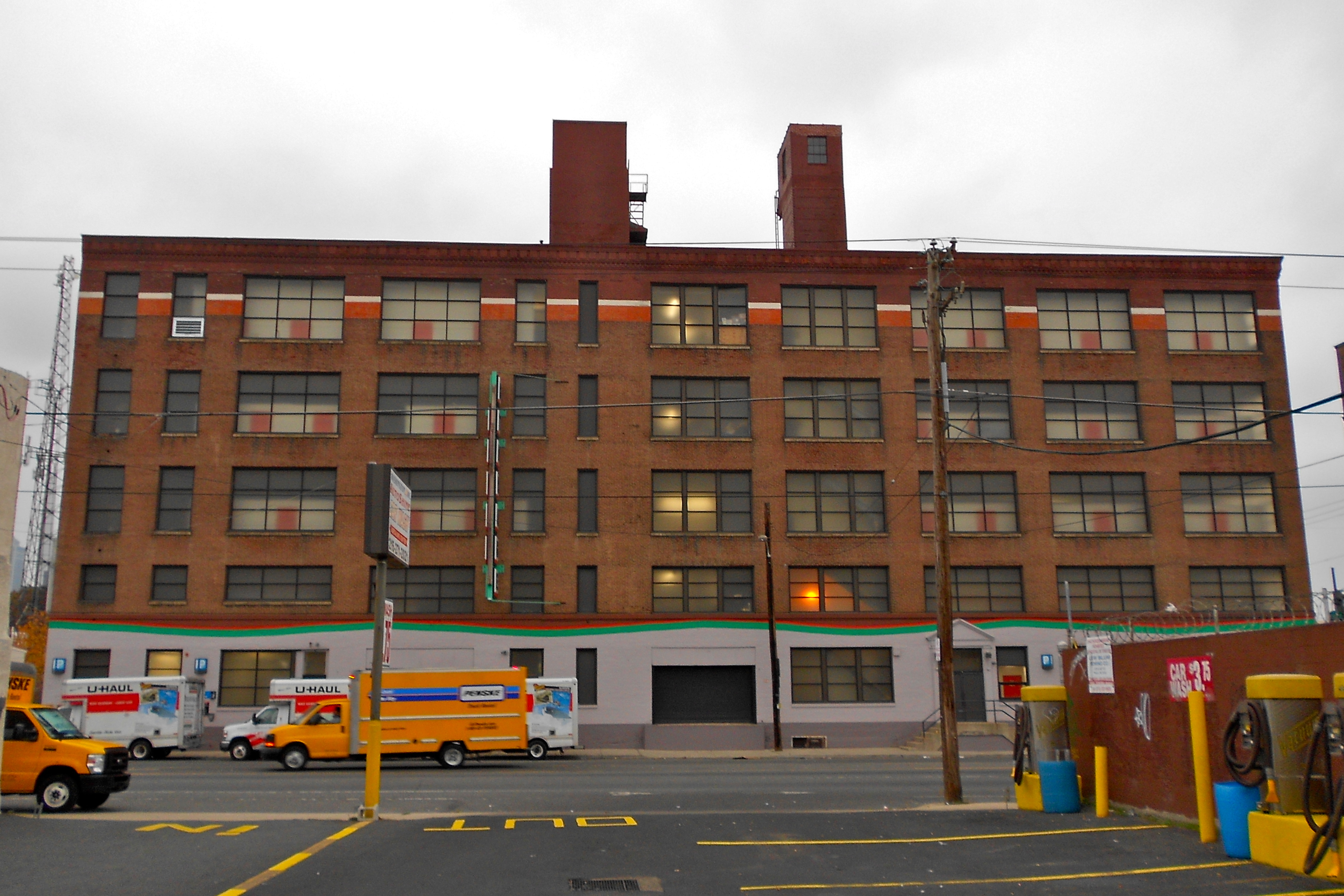
1201 Washington, formerly the John Wyeth Chemical Company

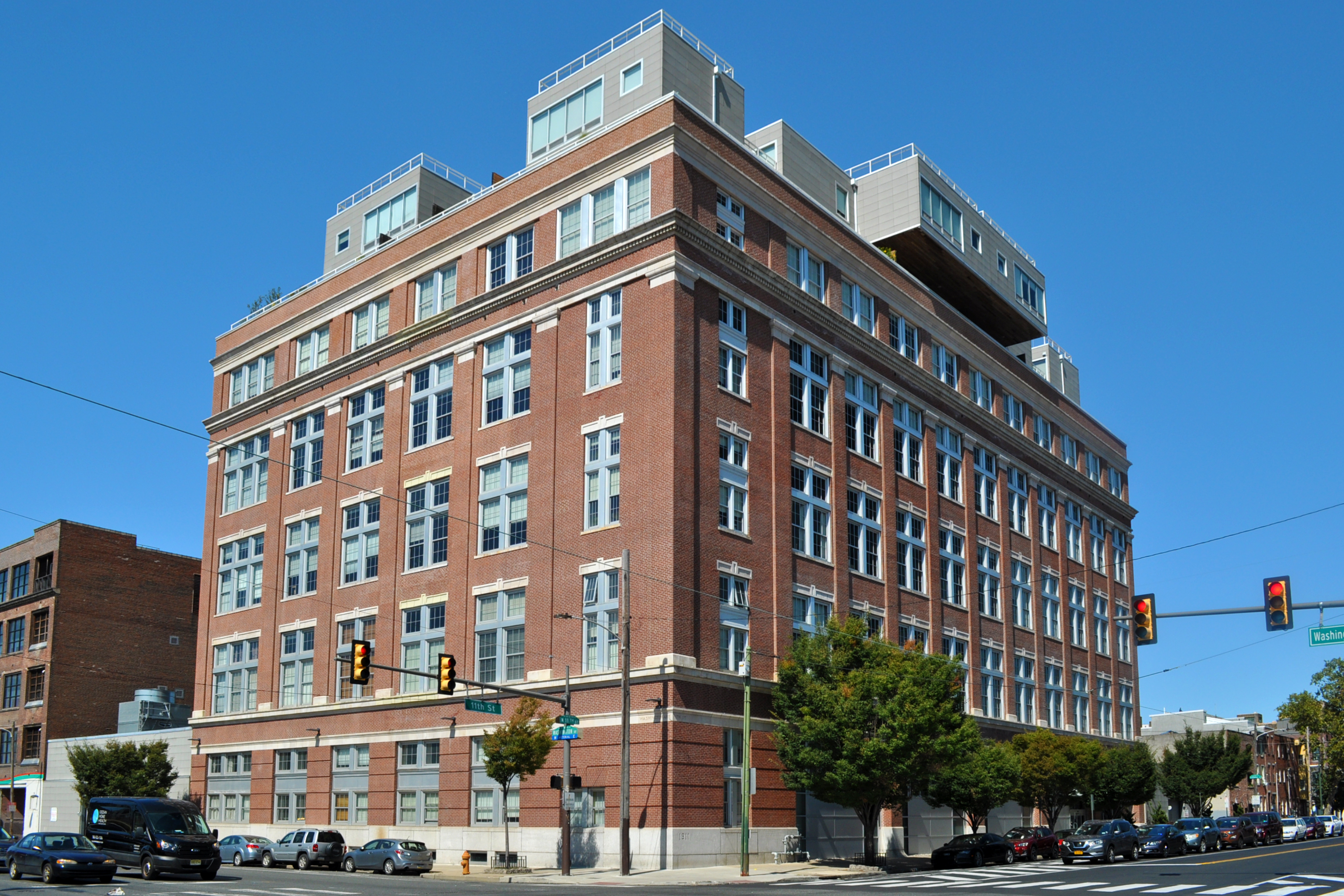
1101 Washington, Lofts at Bella Vista, formerly the Curtis Publishing Company Warehouse

== Public transportation ==
The Washington Avenue Historic District is served by SEPTA's Route 64 bus. Several other transit routes cross Washington Avenue, most important being the subsurface Broad Street Line with its station at Ellsworth-Federal.

== General reference ==
- History extracted from National Register of Historic Places Inventory-Nomination Form, Reference Number 84003561 (Sep 7, 1984): Washington Avenue Historic District (Washington Avenue Factory District), Philadelphia PA
