= Girard Point Bridge =

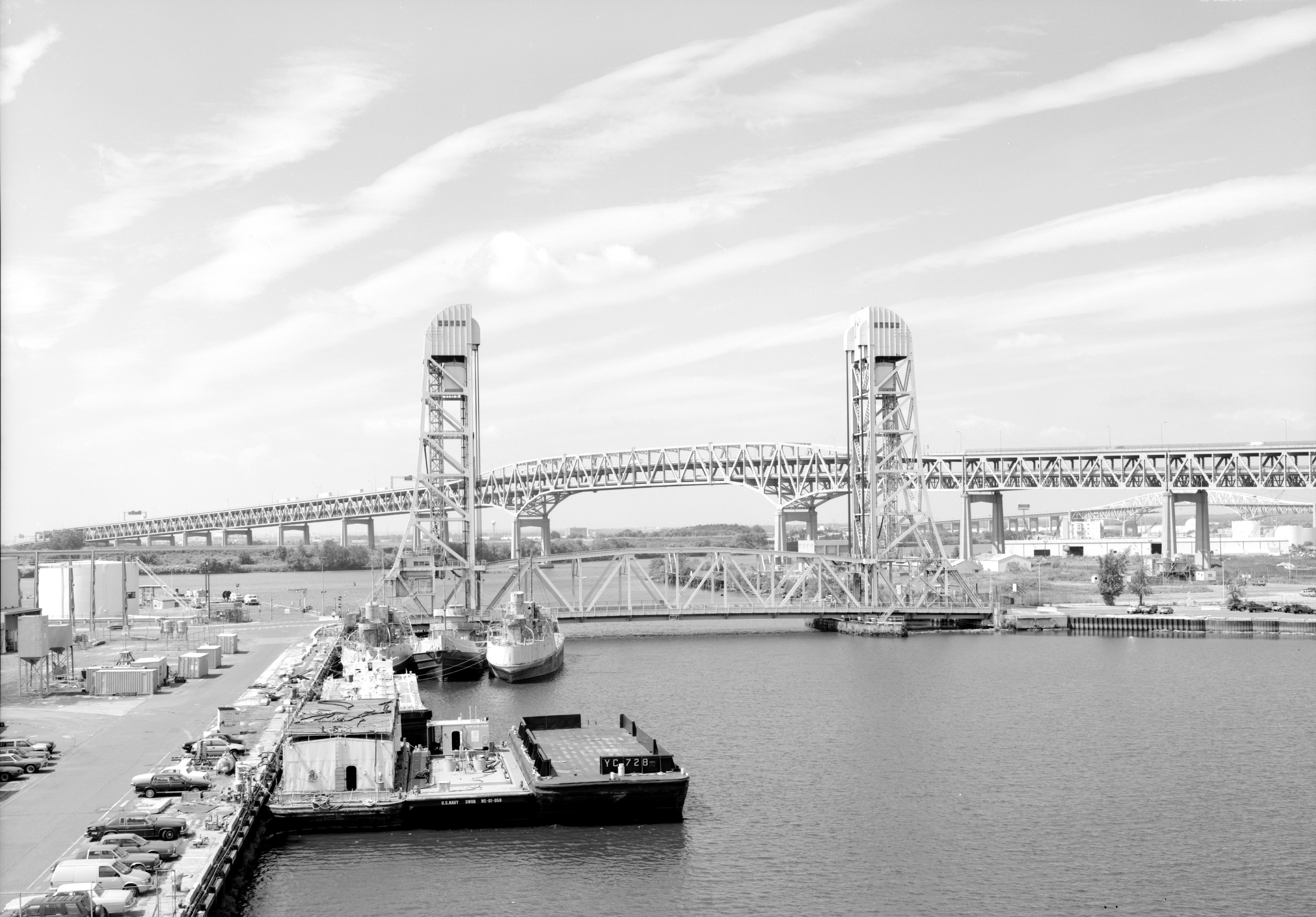
- Girard Point Bridge and Basin Bridge in foreground (1995)
- Coordinates: 39.8925°N 75.197°W
- Carries: 6 lanes (3 upper, 3 lower) of I-95
- Crosses: Schuylkill River
- Locale: Philadelphia, Pennsylvania, United States
- Maintained by: Pennsylvania Department of Transportation

Characteristics
- Design: Double-decked through cantilevered truss bridge
- Total length: 9,090 ft (2,770 m)
- Longest span: 705 ft (215 m)

History
- Construction start: 1968; 58 years ago
- Construction end: 1973; 53 years ago

Statistics
- Toll: None

Location
- Interactive map of Girard Point Bridge

The Girard Point Bridge is a double-decked cantilevered truss bridge carrying Interstate 95 across the Schuylkill River in the American city of Philadelphia, Pennsylvania. The bridge was opened in 1973. It is the last crossing of the Schuylkill River, which empties into the Delaware River less than half a mile downstream. It is crossed by an average of 148,500 vehicles per day, including 6% truck traffic.

== History ==
This 9,324 ft bridge was initially built by American Bridge Company and completed in 1972. It was manufactured with over 30,000 tons of steel.

A bridge similar to this appears in Need for Speed: Most Wanted, except it is designed to resemble the Tobin Bridge in Boston and the Brent Spence Bridge in Ohio.

=== Construction and renovation in 2010 and 2011 ===
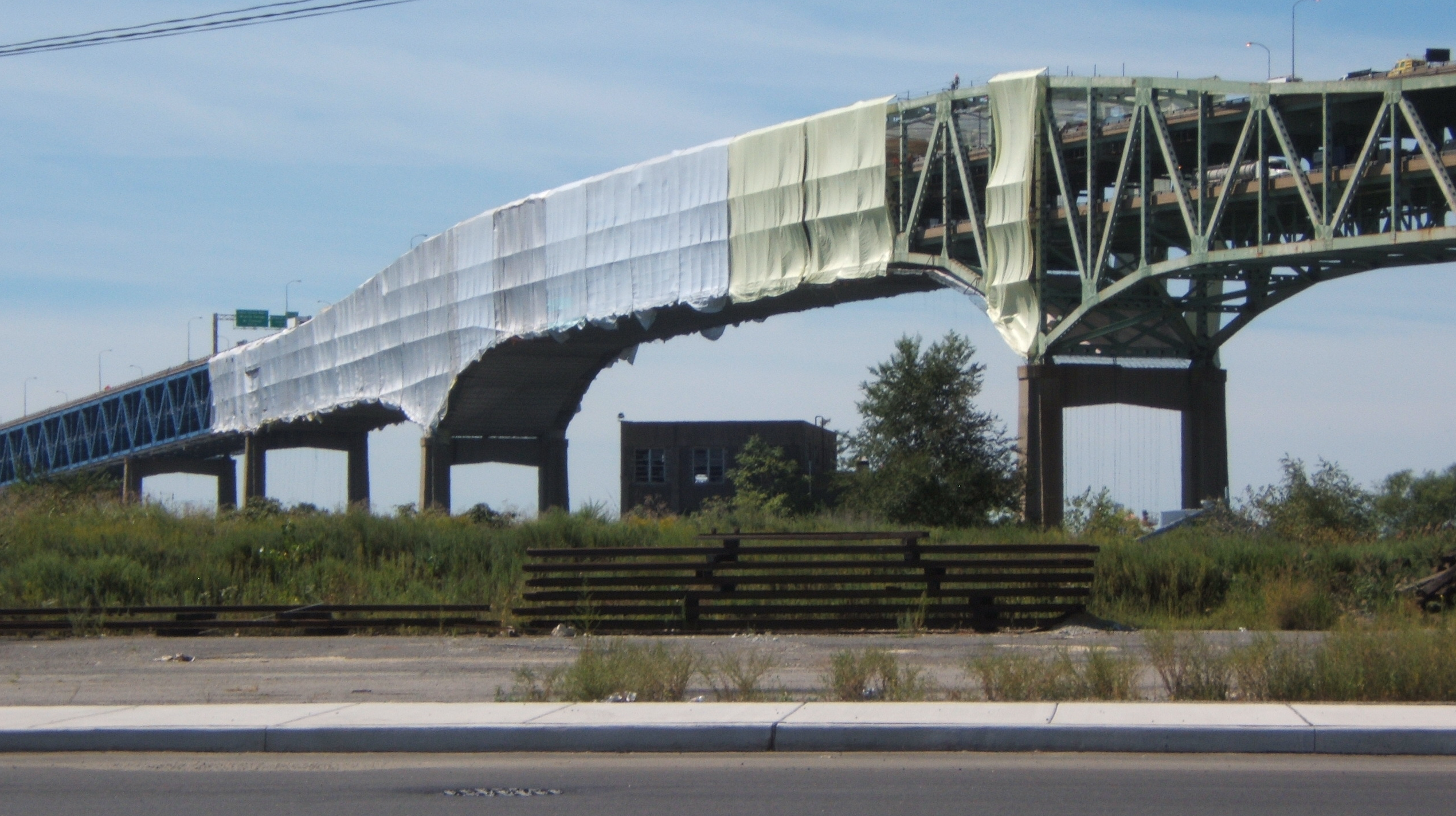
The renovation of the Girard Point Bridge as of September 2010.

The Pennsylvania Department of Transportation selected Buckley and Co. as the main contractor and a joint venture between Alpha-Liberty Painting as the paint contractor. The bridge deck was milled and a new surface was poured and the structural steel was painted in order to extend the life of the steel. Work finished in the fall of 2011, but restarted in 2012 for expansion-joint replacement.

=== Improvement Project Starting December 2025 ===
In December 2025, further renovations started. The improvement project is anticipated to end in April 2031.

== See also ==
- List of crossings of the Delaware River
- List of crossings of the Schuylkill River
- Transportation in Pennsylvania
