= Feltonville, Pennsylvania =

Unincorporated community in Pennsylvania, US

- Unincorporated community
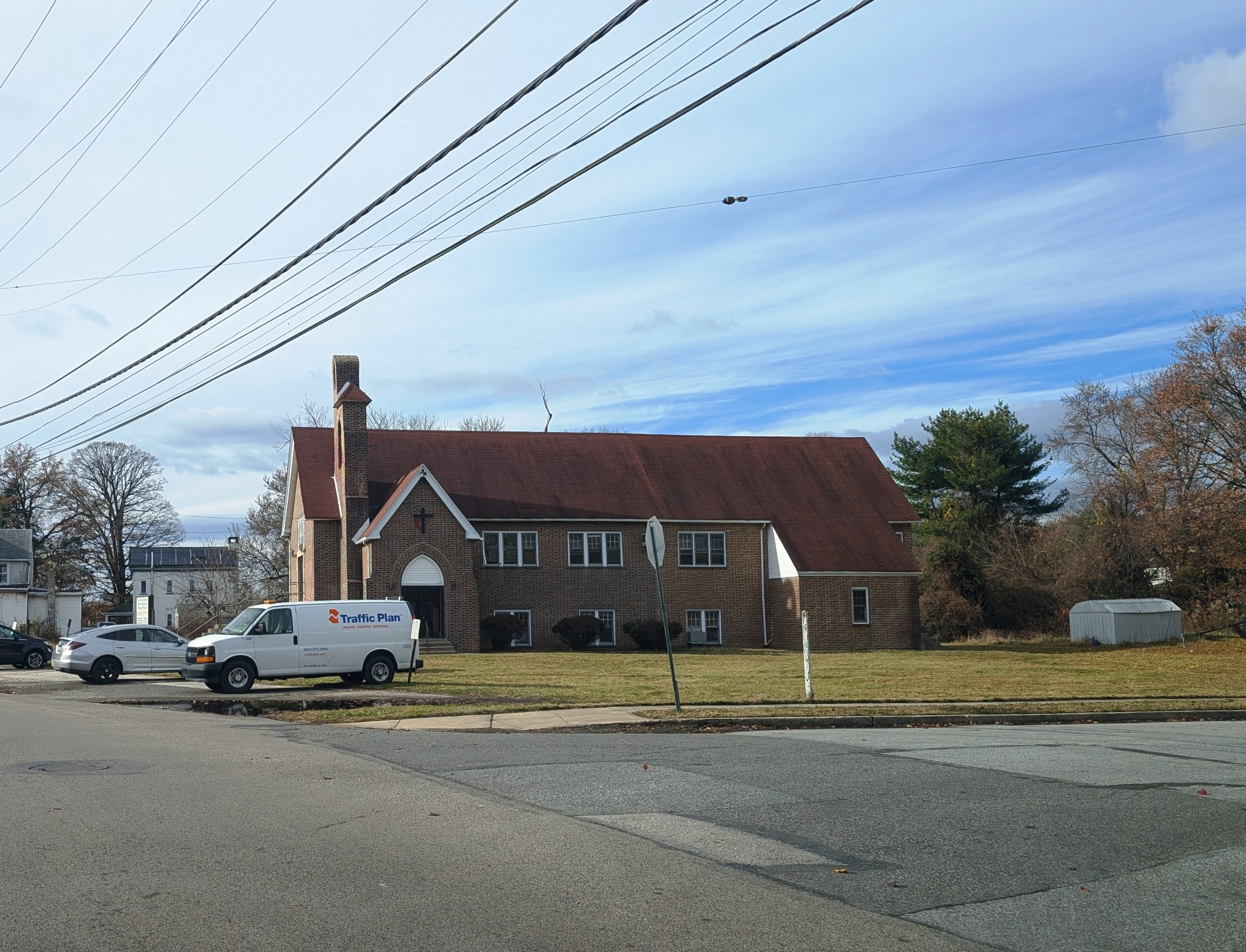
- Aaron Tabernacle United Holiness Church of Life in Feltonville

- Location within Pennsylvania Location within the United States
- Coordinates: 39°50′45″N 75°23′44″W
- Country: United States
- State: Pennsylvania
- County: Delaware
- Township: Chester
- Elevation: 95 ft (29 m)
- Time zone: UTC-5 (Eastern (EST))
  - Summer (DST): UTC-4 (EDT)
- Area codes: 610 and 484
- GNIS feature ID: 1174675

Feltonville is an unincorporated community in Delaware County in the U.S. state of Pennsylvania. Feltonville is located at the intersection of Felton Avenue and Bethel Road, adjacent to Interstate 95/U.S. Route 322 in Chester Township, northwest of the city of Chester.
