= Delaware Avenue Historic District =

Delaware Avenue Historic District may refer to:

- Delaware Avenue Historic District (Wilmington, Delaware)
- Delaware Avenue Historic District (Buffalo, New York)
