= Christopher Columbus Boulevard =

Thoroughfare in Philadelphia, Pennsylvania, US

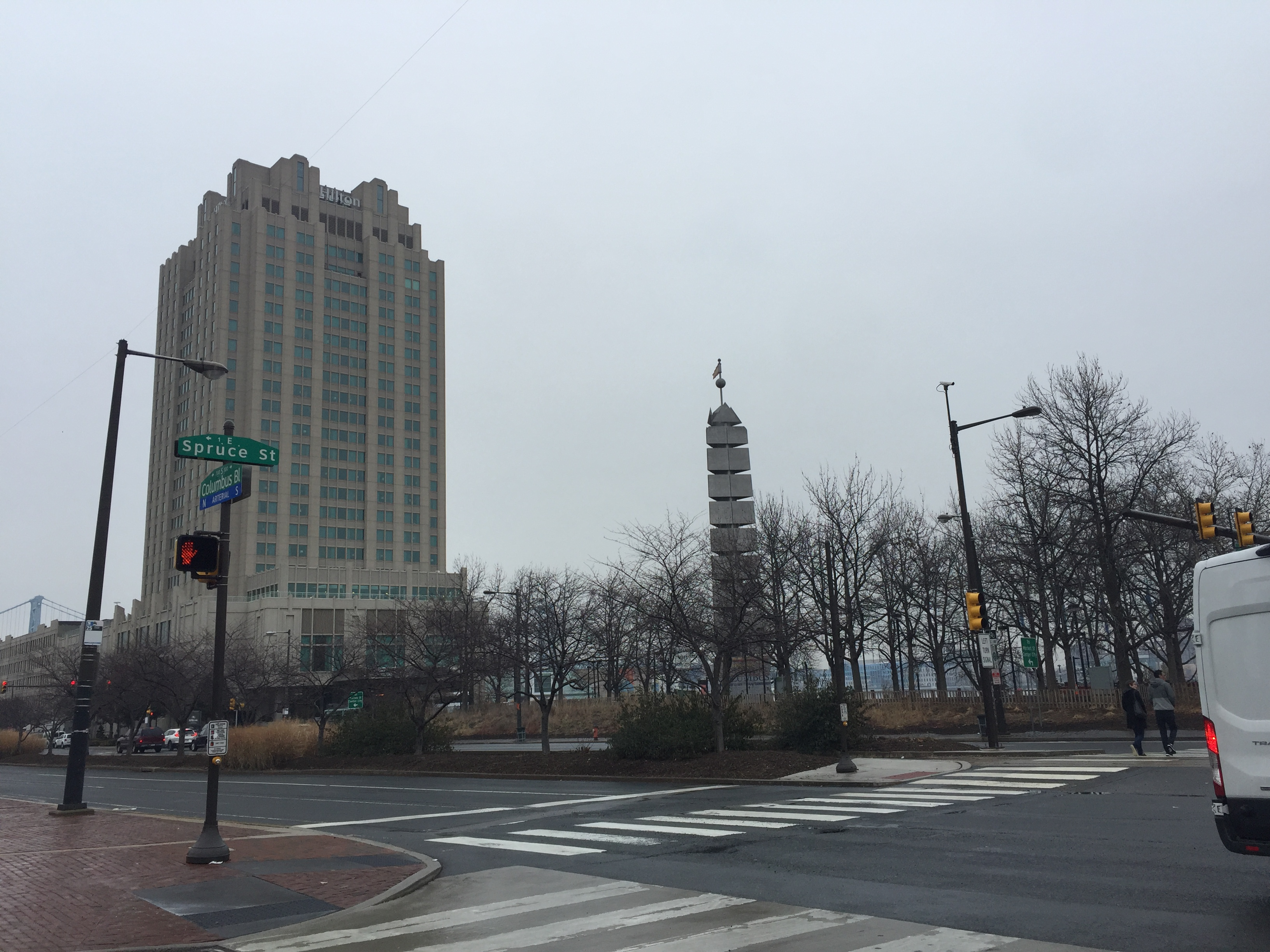
- Columbus and Spruce near Penn's Landing
- Location: Philadelphia
- South end: Pattison Avenue in South Philadelphia
- Major junctions: I-95 in Pennsport and Old City
- North end: Spring Garden Street / Delaware Avenue in Northern Liberties

Christopher Columbus Boulevard (formerly Delaware Avenue) is a major north–south thoroughfare in Philadelphia, Pennsylvania. It is famous for being the location of the Penn's Landing area and is generally parallel with Interstate 95 south of the Benjamin Franklin Bridge. The road extends south towards Pattison Avenue and is home to many big box retailers between Snyder Avenue and Oregon Avenue.

The street originated as an informal footpath connecting the docks and piers along the waterfront, a major Atlantic seaport. In 1831, the Philadelphia banker Stephen Girard, died and left the City $500,000 to construct a wide boulevard in its place, to be known as Delaware Avenue. The portion south of Spring Garden Street was controversially renamed after Christopher Columbus in 1992 despite opposition from residents north of Center City Philadelphia and the Lenape (also known as Delaware) nation. Many Philadelphians continue to refer to it as Delaware Avenue. Some older maps of Philadelphia show this route as once being part of Pennsylvania Route 291.

As of 2023, nearly all of Columbus Boulevard is part of Philadelphia's High Injury Network, the small fraction of city streets on which the majority of traffic deaths and serious injuries occur.

== History ==
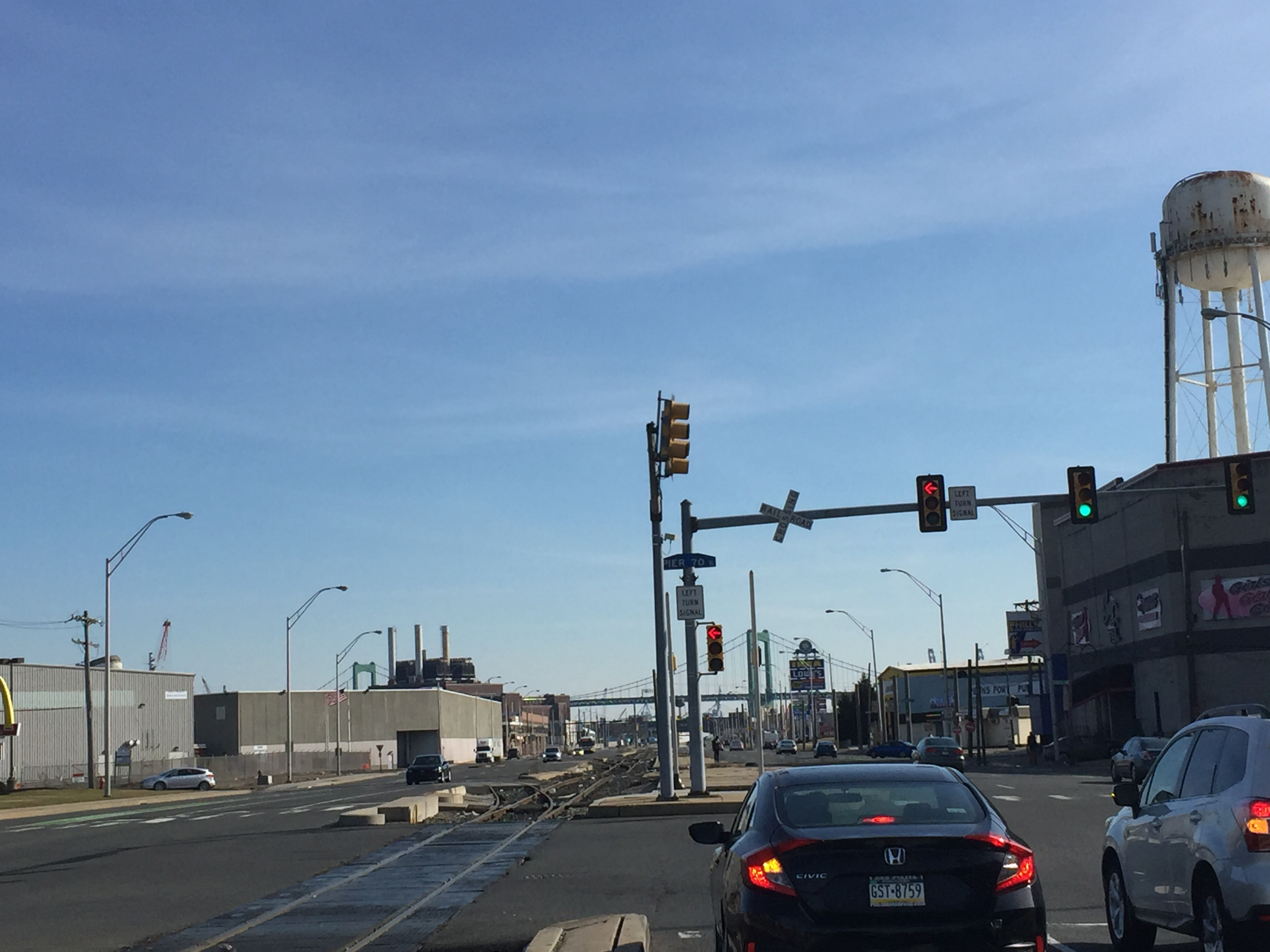
Delaware Avenue at Pier 70 with the Walt Whitman Bridge in the background

Delaware Avenue was originally a "major freshwater port" which has recently seen revitalization with the increase in tourism and the start of casino businesses in the 2000s. The boulevard was dedicated in 1992 as Italian Americans persuaded city hall to rename the portion of Delaware Avenue south of Spring Garden Street on the 500th anniversary of Christopher Columbus sailing to America. The 106-foot-tall Christopher Columbus monument was dedicated in the same year.

Major attractions along this route include the Independence Seaport Museum, Penn's Landing, and several notable ships including; the cruiser USS Olympia, the submarine USS Becuna, and the tall ship Moshulu, along with waterfront views of, and easy access to Camden, New Jersey, New Jersey State's Adventure Aquarium and the warship USS New Jersey across the Delaware river.

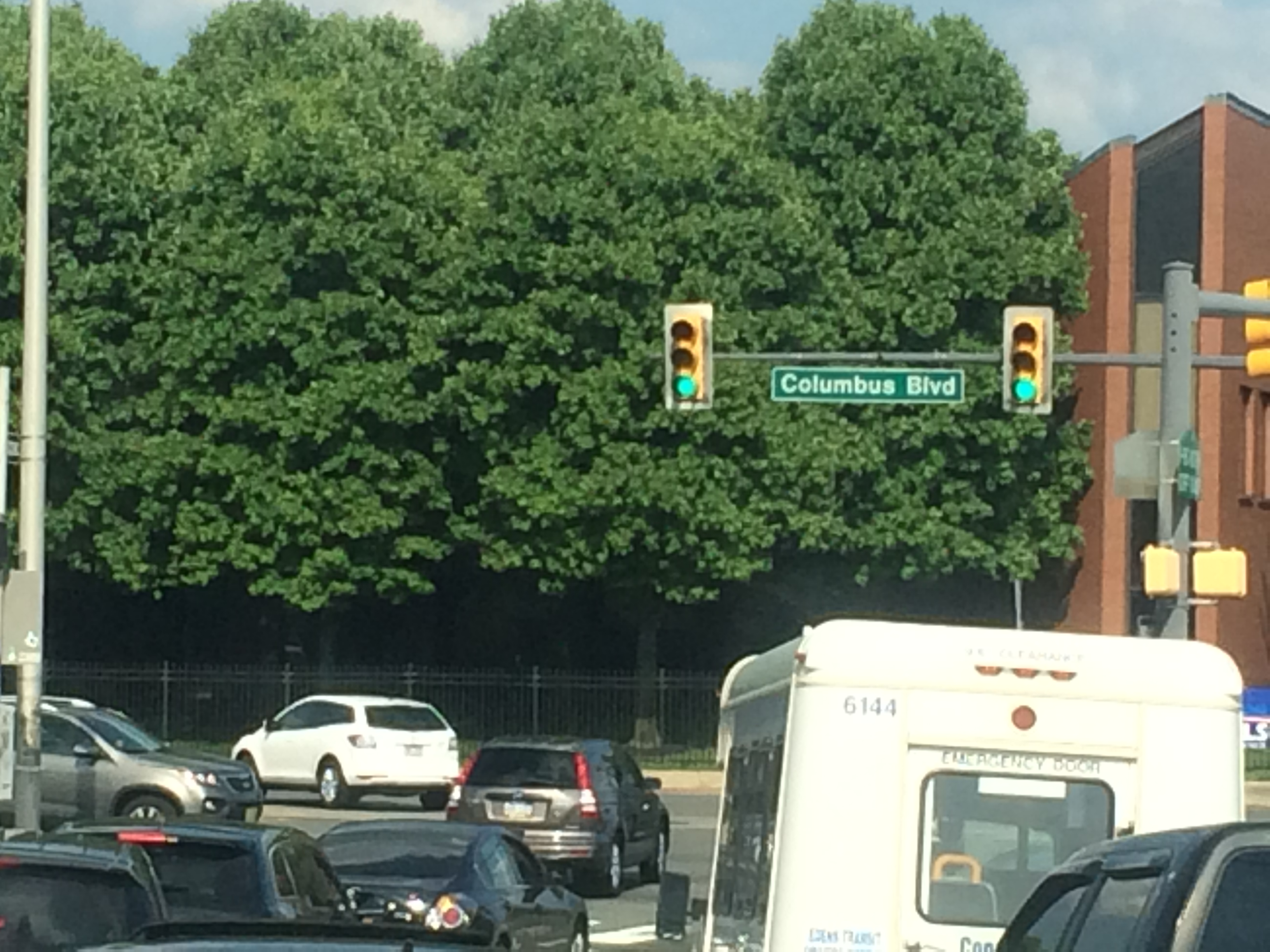

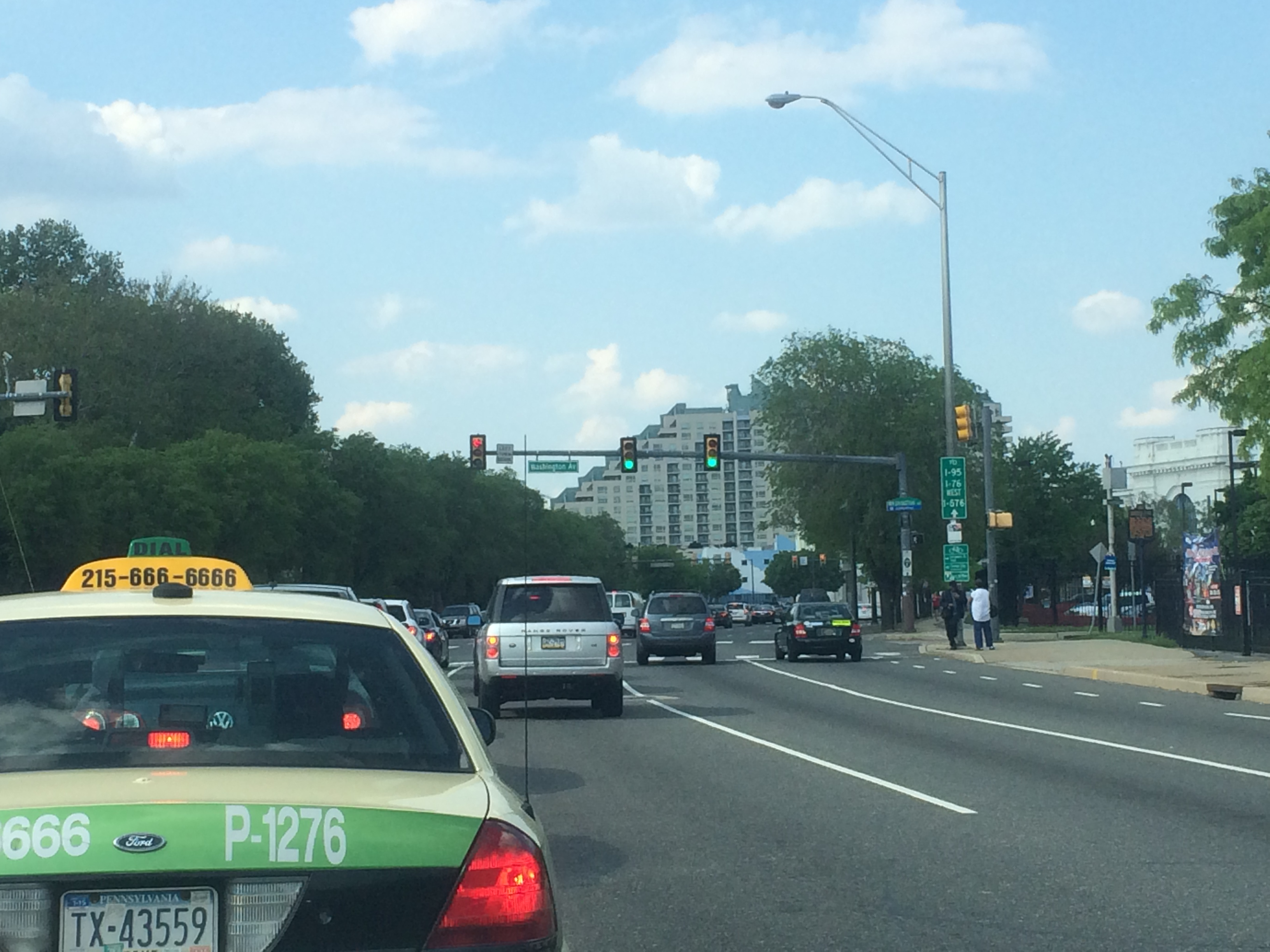
