= Michael Crescenz =

US Army Medal of Honor recipient (1949 – 1968)

Michael Joseph Crescenz
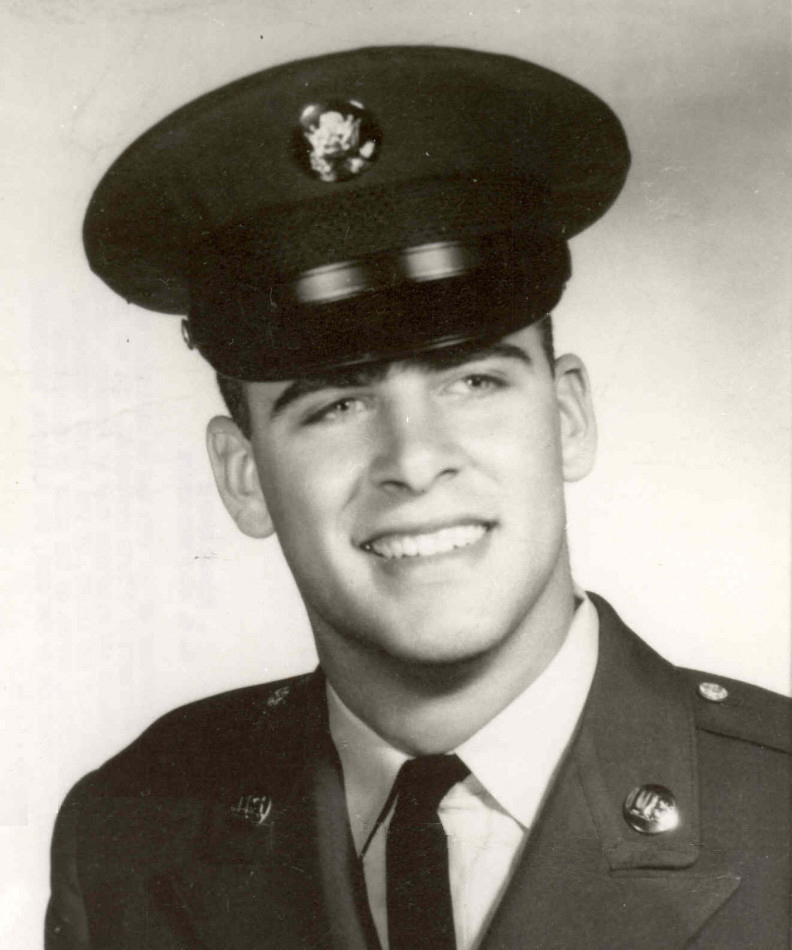
- Portrait of Crescenz, 1968
- Born: January 14, 1949; Philadelphia, Pennsylvania, US
- Died: November 20, 1968 (aged 19); Hiệp Đức District, Quang Nam Province, South Vietnam
- Burial place: Arlington National Cemetery, Arlington, Virginia
- Military career
- Allegiance: United States
- Branch: United States Army
- Service years: 1968
- Rank: Corporal
- Units: Company A, 4th Battalion, 31st Infantry Regiment, 196th Infantry Brigade, 23rd Infantry Division
- Conflicts: Vietnam War †
- Awards: Medal of Honor; Purple Heart

Michael Joseph Crescenz (January 14, 1949 – November 20, 1968) was a United States Army Corporal (Cpl) during the Vietnam War who posthumously received the Medal of Honor for his actions near the Hiep Duc village of Vietnam on November 20, 1968.

== Biography ==
Michael Crescenz was born in Philadelphia on January 14, 1949. He graduated from St. Athanasius School in the West Oak Lane section of Philadelphia in 1962 and from Cardinal Dougherty High School in 1966. Crescenz enlisted in the U.S. Army in February 1968 and shipped out to Vietnam in September 1968, the same month that his older brother Charles, a United States Marine who had served 13 months in Vietnam, was discharged from active duty.

Crescenz received a posthumous promotion to the rank of corporal. He was the only Philadelphian to receive the Medal of Honor during the Vietnam War. Crescenz was survived by his parents and five brothers. His Medal of Honor was presented to his family by President Richard M. Nixon in a White House ceremony on April 7, 1970. To respect his parents' wishes, Cpl. Crescenz was buried in Holy Sepulchre Cemetery, in Cheltenham Township, Pennsylvania. In 2008, after the death of his parents, Crescenz was reinterred at Arlington National Cemetery.

The Philadelphia Veterans Affairs Medical Center has been renamed the Corporal Michael J. Crescenz, Department of Veterans Affairs Medical Center. (http://www.philadelphia.va.gov/)

== Medal of Honor citation ==
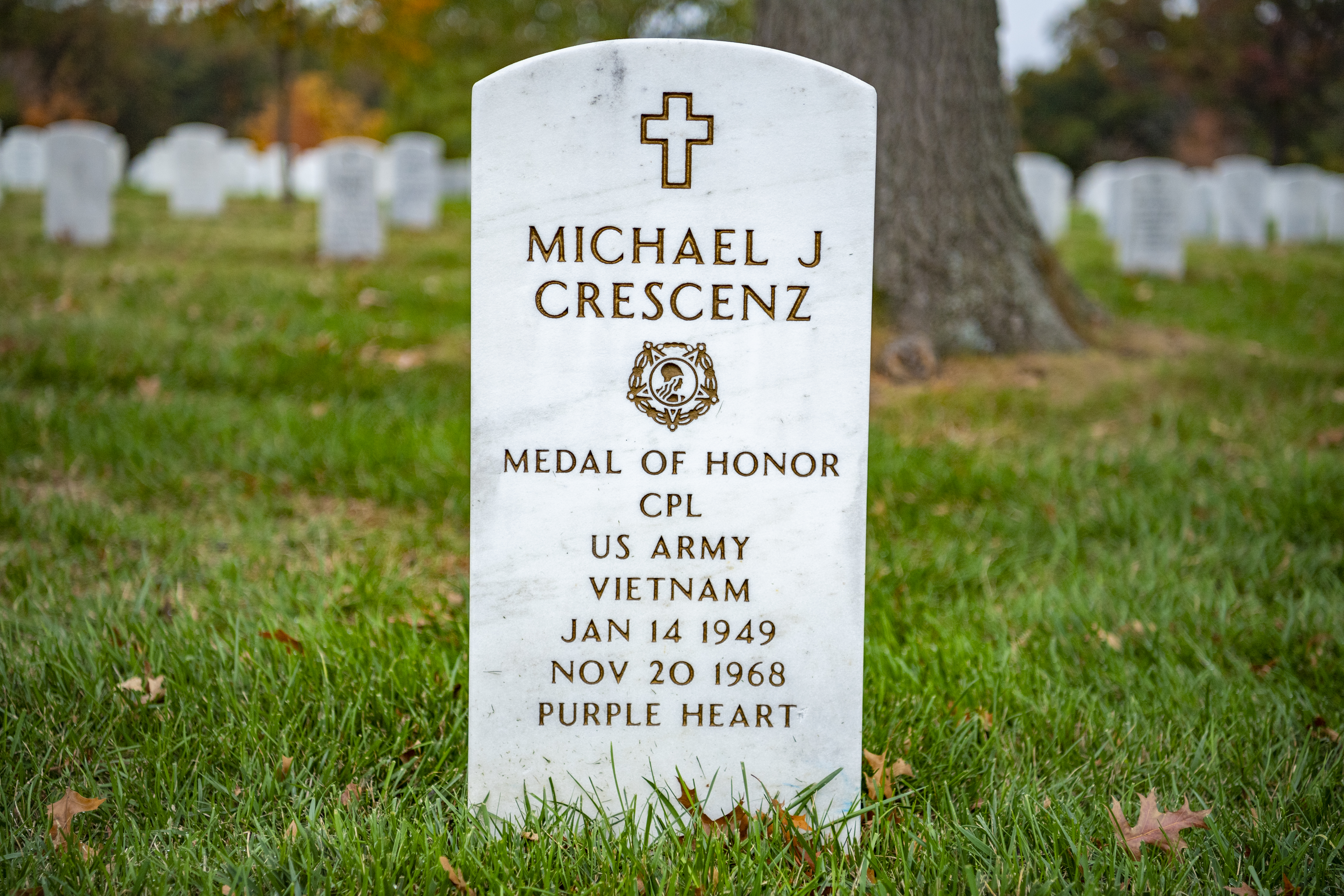
Grave at Arlington National Cemetery

Michael J. Crescenz
Rank and Organization: Corporal, U.S. Army, Company A, 4th Battalion, 31st Infantry, 196th Infantry Brigade, Americal Division.
Place and date: Hiep Duc Valley area, Republic of Vietnam, November 20, 1968.
Entered service at: Philadelphia, Pennsylvania.
Born: January 14, 1949, Philadelphia, Pennsylvania.

The President of the United States in the name of the Congress of the United States takes pride in presenting the MEDAL OF HONOR posthumously to

MICHAEL JOSEPH CRESCENZ
Corporal, Army of the United States

for service as set forth in the following CITATION:

Cpl. Crescenz distinguished himself by conspicuous gallantry and intrepidity in action while serving as a rifleman with Company A. In the morning his unit engaged a large, well-entrenched force of the North Vietnamese Army whose initial burst of fire pinned down the lead squad and killed the 2 point men, halting the advance of Company A. Immediately, Cpl. Crescenz left the relative safety of his own position, seized a nearby machine gun and, with complete disregard for his safety, charged 100 meters up a slope toward the enemy's bunkers which he effectively silenced, killing the 2 occupants of each. Undaunted by the withering machine gun fire around him, Cpl. Crescenz courageously moved forward toward a third bunker which he also succeeded in silencing, killing 2 more of the enemy and momentarily clearing the route of advance for his comrades. Suddenly, intense machine gun fire erupted from an unseen, camouflaged bunker. Realizing the danger to his fellow soldiers, Cpl. Crescenz disregarded the barrage of hostile fire directed at him and daringly advanced toward the position. Assaulting with his machine gun, Cpl. Crescenz was within 5 meters of the bunker when he was mortally wounded by the fire from the enemy machine gun. As a direct result of his heroic actions, his company was able to maneuver freely with minimal danger and to complete its mission, defeating the enemy. Cpl. Crescenz's bravery and extraordinary heroism at the cost of his life are in the highest traditions of the military service and reflect great credit on himself, his unit, and the U.S. Army.

== Military awards ==
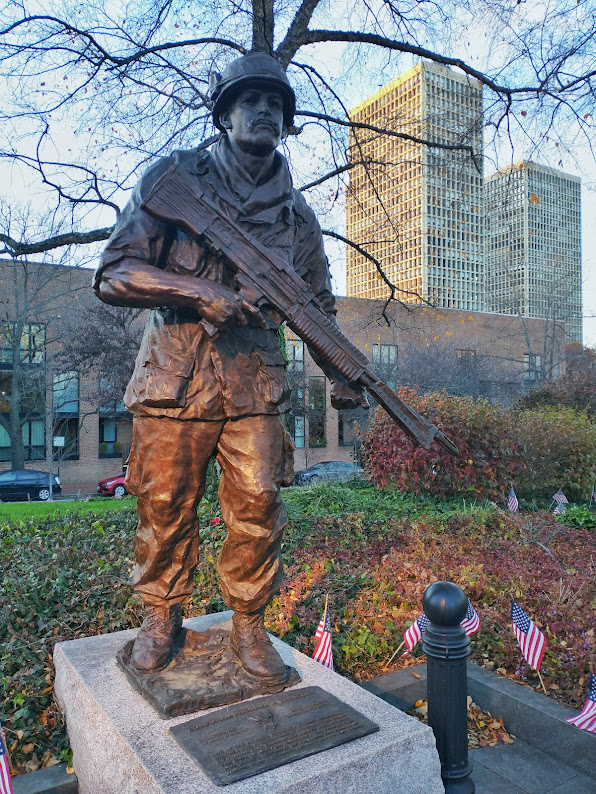
Cpl. Crescenz statue in the Philadelphia Vietnam Veterans Memorial

Medal of Honor		Purple Heart
National Defense Service Medal	Vietnam Service Medal with one bronze service star	Vietnam Campaign Medal

Badges:

- Combat Infantryman Badge

== In memory ==
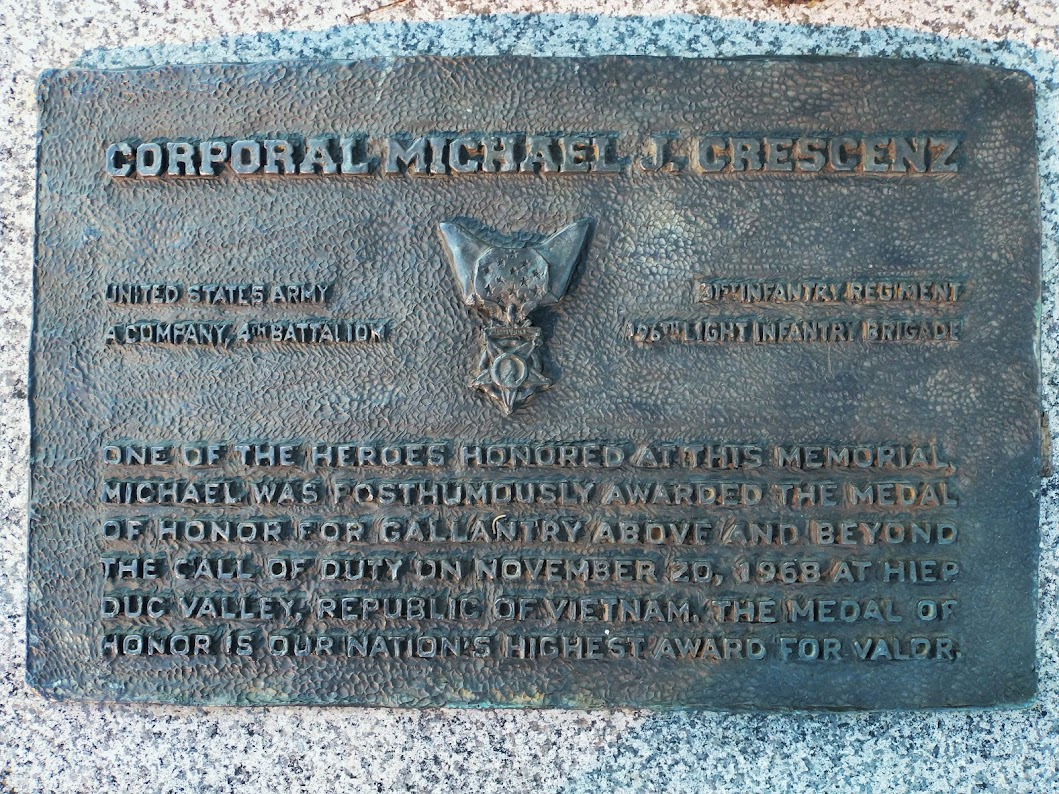
Cpl. Crescenz plaque in the Philadelphia Vietnam Veterans Memorial

Corporal Michael Joseph Crescenz has his name inscribed on the Vietnam Veterans Memorial ("The Wall") in Washington, D.C., on Panel 38W Line 016.

The Philadelphia VA Medical Center was renamed the "Corporal Michael J. Crescenz Department of Veterans Affairs Medical Center" in his honor on May 2, 2015.

An 8-foot tall bronze statue honoring Cpl. Crescenz is part of the Philadelphia Vietnam Veterans Memorial. He is the only Philadelphian to receive the Medal of Honor for the Vietnam War.

== See also ==
- List of Medal of Honor recipients
- List of Medal of Honor recipients for the Vietnam War
