= Independence Seaport Museum =

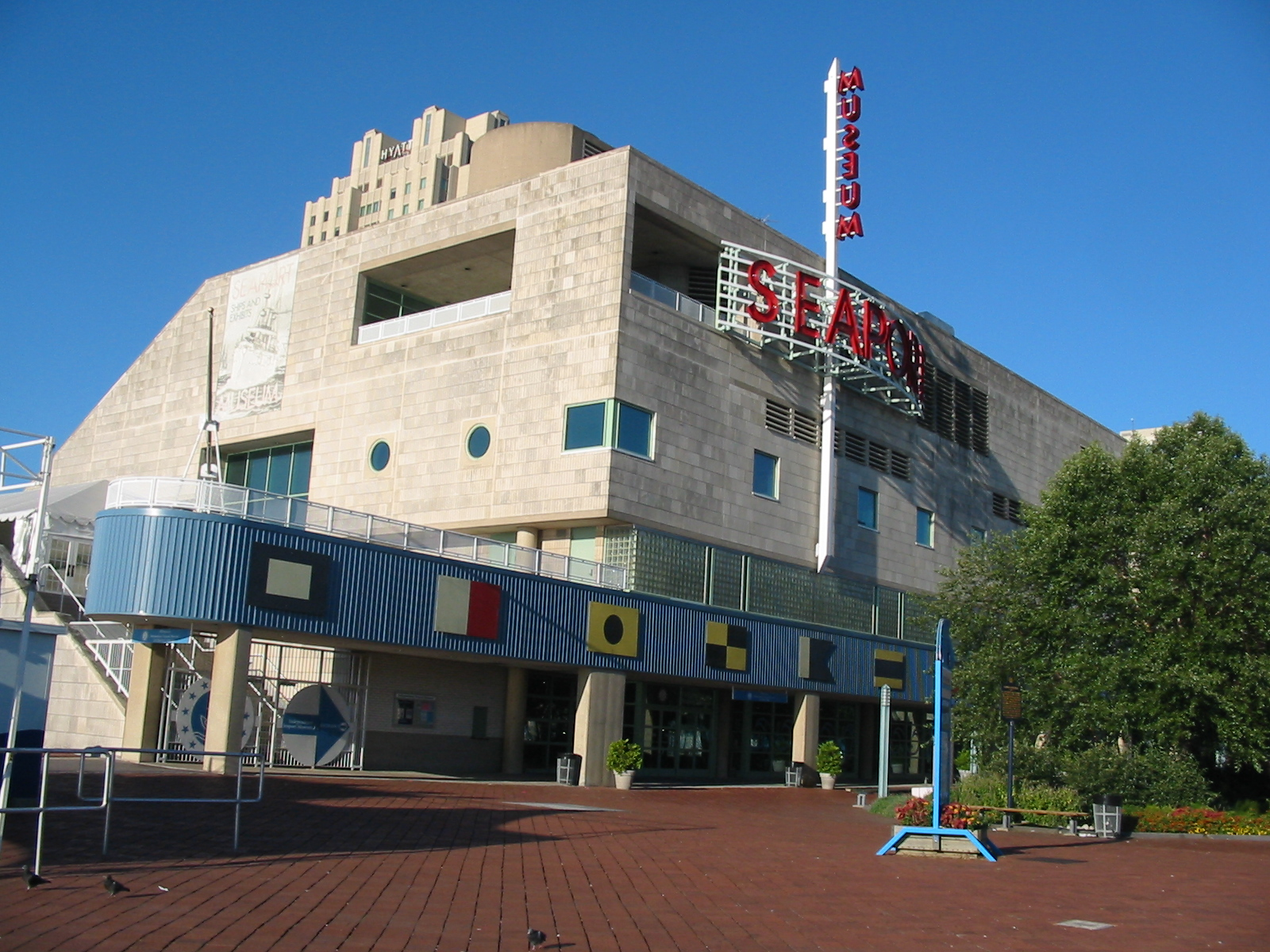
- Exterior of the Independence Seaport Museum

- Location within Pennsylvania
- Established: 1961
- Location: Penn's Landing, Philadelphia, Pennsylvania, United States
- Coordinates: 39.945314°N 75.141771°W
- Type: Maritime Museum
- Visitors: 84,000 (2011)
- Director: John Brady (CEO)
- Curator: Craig Bruns
- Public transit access: 2nd Street: L SEPTA bus: 12, 17, 21, 33, 42, 76
- Website: www.phillyseaport.org

The Independence Seaport Museum (formerly the Philadelphia Maritime Museum) was founded in 1961 and is located in the Penn's Landing complex along the Delaware River in Philadelphia, Pennsylvania. The collections at the Independence Seaport Museum document maritime history and culture along the Delaware River. At the museum are two National Historic Landmark ships and the J. Welles Henderson Archives and Library.

== History ==
In 1961, maritime collector J. Welles Henderson felt that Philadelphia's maritime history had been forgotten, and was frustrated that his city lacked a maritime museum like those in New England. To rectify this issue, he rented space in the Athenaeum on Washington Square to open the Philadelphia Maritime Museum. Initially the museum housed his personal collection of maritime items. In 1974, the museum moved to 321 Chestnut Street, into a building built in 1898 for the First National Bank. In 1995, the museum moved to Penn's Landing along the Delaware River, after spending $15 million to renovate a building used by the Port of History Museum, which had closed two years earlier. It was renamed the Independence Seaport Museum.

In June 2007, former Independence Seaport Museum president John S. Carter pleaded guilty to charges of fraud and tax evasion from misappropriating about US$2.5 million in funds from the museum. He received a 15-year sentence in federal prison. Carter, who was president of the museum from 1989 to March 2006, was accused of using money from the museum to buy numerous personal items, including two boats, an espresso machine, and a carriage house for his home in Cape Cod between 1997 and 2006.

In February 2010, museum officials announced that the cruiser USS Olympia needed $10 to $20 million for hull repairs to prevent her from sinking and would consider transferring her to a new steward. The Seaport Museum held a preservation summit in March 2011, and shortly thereafter announced that qualified interested organizations could apply for stewardship of Olympia through a transfer application process vetted by a review panel of historic ship and preservation experts. In 2014 the museum announced that it had cancelled plans to seek a new steward and instead would focus its efforts on raising the funds necessary to repair the Ship. In 2014 the museum received $6 million in funding from the Redevelopment Assistance Capital program, which covered a portion of the repairs. Over the next several years, the museum was awarded grants from private donors, as well as federal and state agencies to help cover the preservation costs. In 2017, the Independence Seaport Museum completed the first phase of renovations to the Ship and is working to raise the funds necessary to tow the vessel to a dry-dock facility so that its hull can be repaired.

In April 2011, John Brady was named the Seaport Museum's President & CEO. Brady was formerly the longtime director of the Workshop on the Water, the museum's boat shop specializing in the building and restoration of traditional wooden boats. In June 2015, the museum nearly doubled its endowment after receiving four large donations totaling nearly $13.9 million to help fund museum programs, exhibitions, and the restoration to the two historic ships. In January 2016, the Independence Seaport Museum was given a grant of over $1 million by the William Penn Foundation to fund environmental and clean water programs, as well as, exhibitions, and renovations to the dock. In 2017, the Independence Seaport Museum received a grant of $2.6 million from William Penn Foundation to support the River Alive exhibition.

== Current exhibits ==
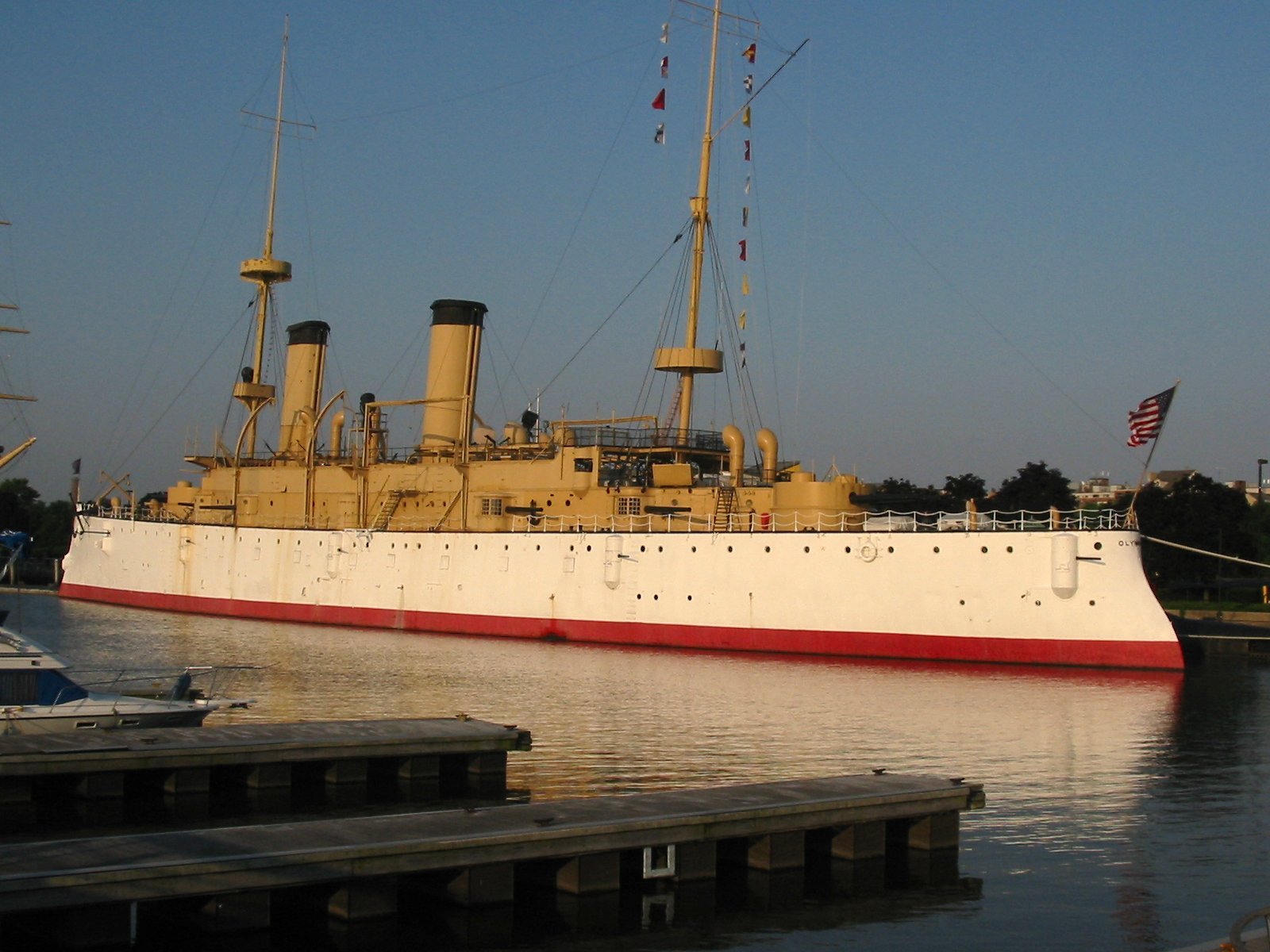
USS Olympia at Penn's Landing

=== World War I USS Olympia ===
In June 2017, the museum opened an exhibit to commemorate the World War I centennial. The World War I USS Olympia exhibit highlights the ship's humanitarian and peace-keeping role in World War I Europe. The exhibit explores the everyday life of sailors aboard the ship, as well as Olympia's final mission of transporting the remains of the Unknown Soldier from France to Arlington National Cemetery in Washington, DC.

=== Patriots and Pirates ===
In April 2016, the Independence Seaport Museum opened a new exhibit which focuses on Philadelphia and the founding of the United States Navy. As the name suggests, Patriots and Pirates, examines the conflict between pirates and the United States, and features a full-size, waterline model of Diligence of 1797. Some notable artifacts in the exhibit include a rare 1793 letter from an American taken hostage by pirates, Captain John Barry's octant, and a model of the Federal St. Navy Yard recreating Joshua Humphreys' 18th century shipyard.

=== Tides of Freedom: African Presence on the Delaware River ===
Tides of Freedom: African Presence on the Delaware River, curated by University of Pennsylvania Professor of Sociology and Africana Studies Tukufu Zuberi, opened in May 2013 and explores African-American history along the Delaware River. The exhibit focuses on the slave trade along the Delaware River, emancipation and the abolitionist movement in Philadelphia, and Philadelphia's connection to the underground railroad. The exhibit continues into the modern era, focusing on Jim Crow and Civil Rights in Philadelphia. On display at the exhibit are slave shackles and an 18th-century account book that documents the sale of slaves in Philadelphia.

=== Rescues on the River ===
Rescues on the River tells the story of maritime disasters along the Delaware River, exploring how tragedy shaped modern maritime safety regulations and led to the formation of the United States Coast Guard. The exhibit begins with a late 18th-century Revolutionary War-era explosion of a British ship and ends with the 1975 oil tanker collision and resulting fire.

=== Titanic Philadelphians ===
Titanic Philadelphians opened in 2012, to commemorate the 100th anniversary of the sinking of RMS Titanic. The exhibit focuses on the approximately 40 Philadelphian passengers of Titanic, their first hand accounts, and how their lives were forever altered by the tragedy. On display is a rare first class passenger list which was salvaged by Marian Longstreth Thayer, who unknowingly had the list in her pocket as she boarded a lifeboat and whose husband died in the disaster.

=== Coming to America ===
Coming to America spotlights the experiences of immigrants who left their homeland for the United States and passed through Philadelphia's Washington Avenue Immigration Station. On display are artifacts and oral histories of both wealthy first-class passengers and economically disadvantaged passengers traveling in steerage.

=== Philadelphia and the China Trade ===
In the 18th century, Philadelphia became one of the first American cities to begin trading with China. Philadelphia and the China Trade chronicles the history of trade between the two nations and explores the lasting impact it had on Philadelphia's culture and economy.

=== Navigation ===
This exhibit spotlights navigation science. On display are navigational tools from the early American colonial period to the present.

=== Community Gallery Series ===
The Community Gallery Series began in February 2012. These temporary exhibits are the result of collaboration between Museum staff and Philadelphia area curators and historians. Some present and past exhibits include Philadelphia Rowing: Breaking down Barriers, Oh, Sugar! The Magical Transformation from Cane to Candy, Digging the City: Archaeological Discoveries from the Philadelphia Waterfront, and Art in the Open: The Exhibition.

== Historic ships ==
At the Independence Seaport Museum are two National Landmark historic ships: cruiser Olympia and submarine Becuna.

=== USS Olympia (C-6) ===
USS Olympia, a warship that played a vital role during the Spanish–American War at the Battle of Manila Bay, is the only surviving American naval warship from her era. Olympia served in World War I, was decommissioned in 1922, and became a part of The Independence Seaport Museum in 1996. Currently she is a museum ship where visitors can walk aboard, tour, and watch historical reenactments conducted by the Cruiser Olympia Living History Crew. The Independence Seaport Museum is raising funds to preserve the ship and to conduct necessary repairs.

=== USS Becuna (SS-319) ===
USS Becuna is a World War II and Cold War-era submarine. She was launched in 1944, was decommissioned in 1969, and became a part of the Independence Seaport Museum in 1996. She is now a museum submarine where people can enter, explore the historical artifacts housed aboard the submarine, and take tours.

== J. Welles Henderson Research Center ==
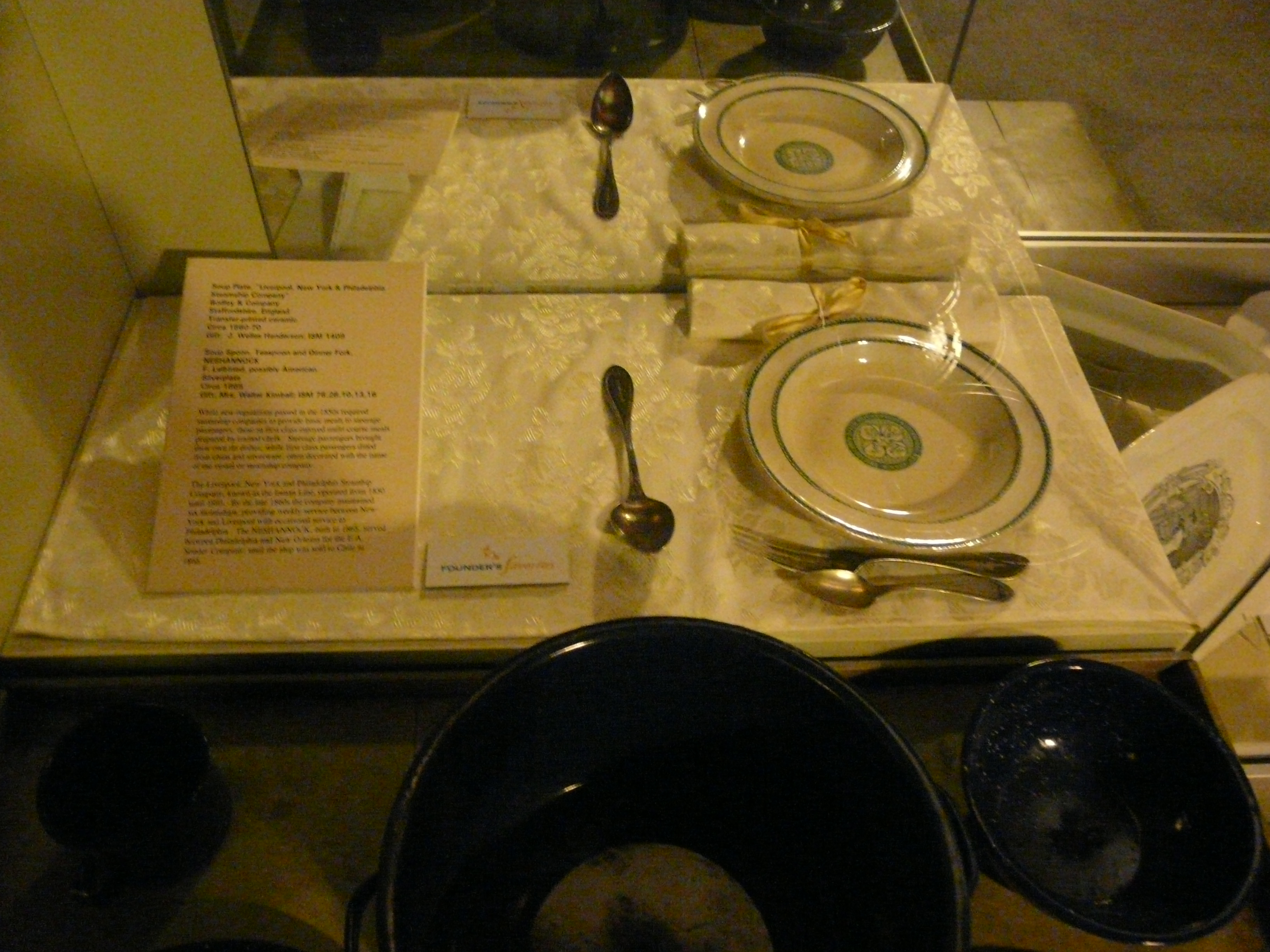
19th century soup plate and spoon. Independence Seaport Museum (2011) by Piotrus

The J. Welles Henderson Research Center is located on the second floor of the museum. The collection focuses on maritime history and culture along the Delaware River and in the Port of Philadelphia from early America to the present. The Archive includes personal and business records, rare books, reference materials, mechanical drawings, ship models, maps, art, architectural drawings, charts, recordings, photographs, cultural artifacts, and ephemera. Notable items in the collection include the John Barry-Hayes collection, Reed & Ford business papers, Captain John Greene Collection, the Philadelphia Maritime Exchange records, and the collection of 16th–18th century geographical maps and charts. The Archive also maintains the cruiser Olympia and submarine Becuna collections. In August 2016 the Archive launched its first online catalog, which lists inventories of its archival collections.

== Public and educational programs ==
Over the past several years, the museum has expanded its public and educational programming for adults, families, and children. Educational programs, such as lectures, science labs, summer camps, and field trips, explore the history and ecology of the Delaware through science, math, biology, and engineering. Other programs, such as Workshop on the Water and the Hammer and Nails Series, teach boat building and sailing.

== See also ==
- Moshulu
- Gazela
- List of maritime museums in the United States
- List of museum ships
