= Jim Callahan (American football, born 1946) =

American football player (born 1946)

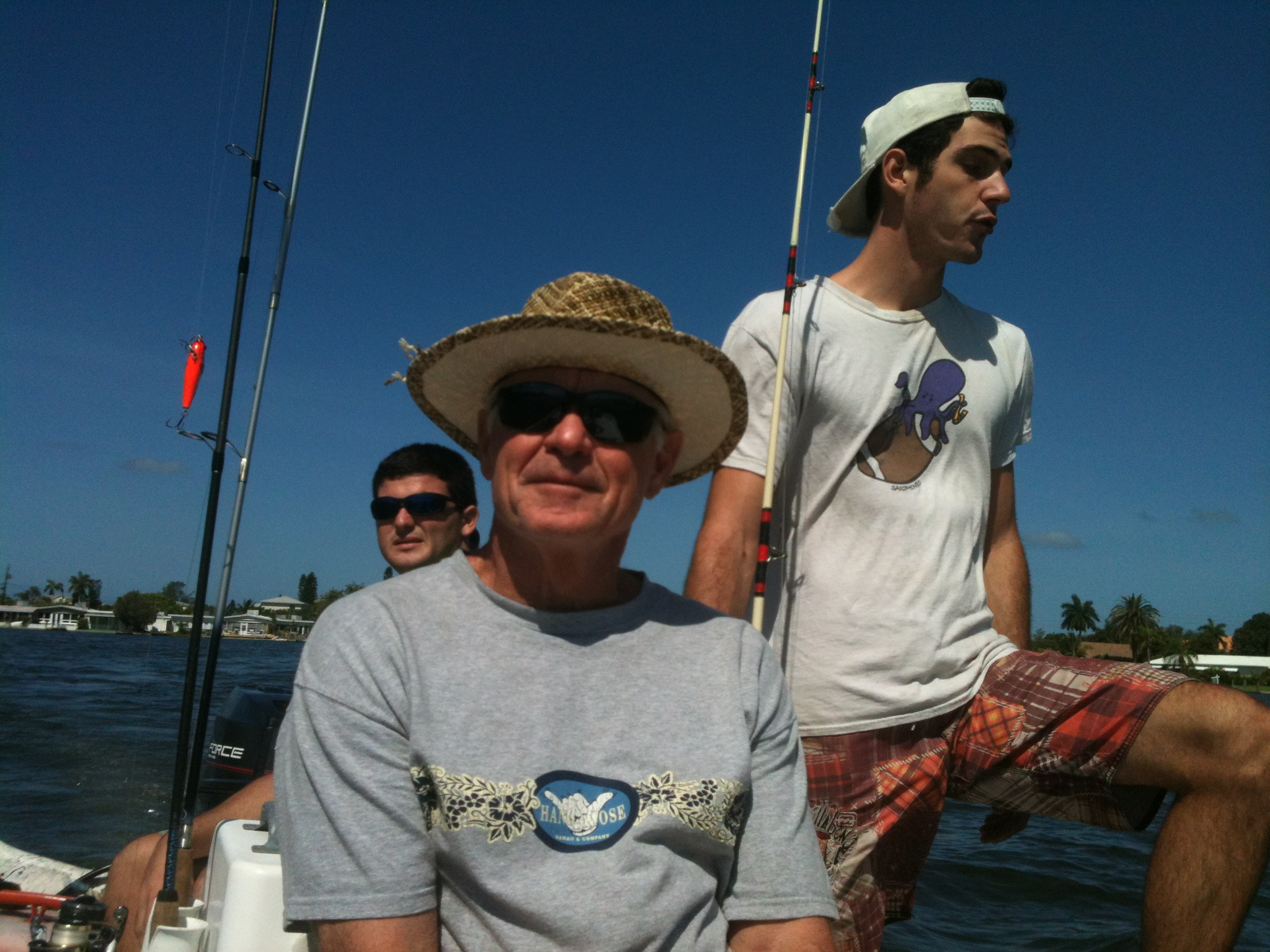
- Callahan in 2012

No. 83
- Position: Wide receiver

Personal information
- Born: July 29, 1946 (age 80); Philadelphia, Pennsylvania, U.S.

Career information
- College: Temple

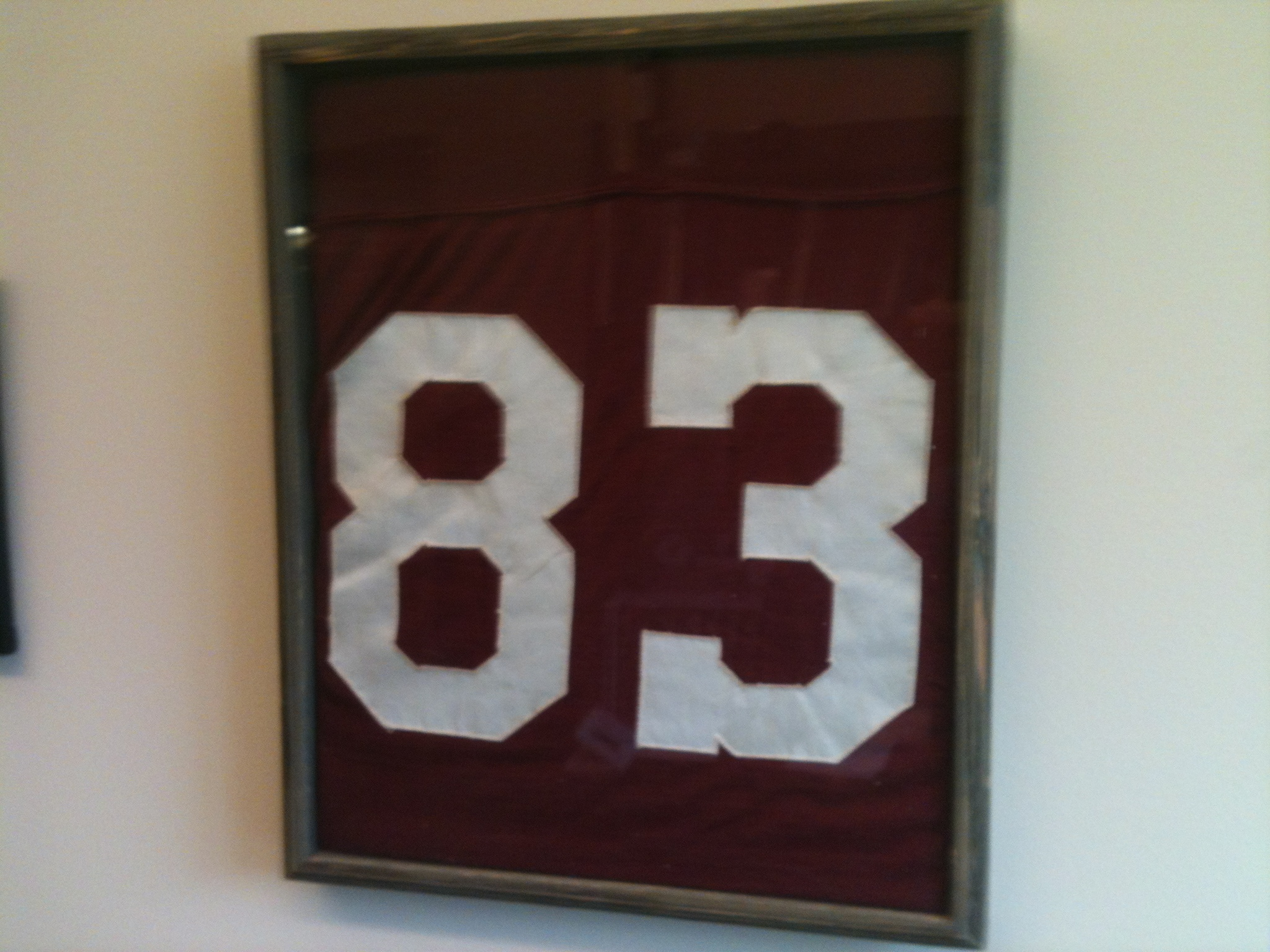
Callahan's Temple University football jersey as it appears today.

Jim Callahan (born July 29, 1946) is an American former football player and author who currently resides in Anna Maria, Florida. Callahan was selected in the eighth round of the 1969 NFL/AFL draft by the Atlanta Falcons. Callahan was recruited out of college by future National Football League (NFL) general manager Bobby Beathard and signed a contract with the Falcons one month later.

Callahan played wide receiver at Temple University for the 1966, 1967, and 1968 football teamsg under head coach George Makris. Prior to enrollment at Temple University, Callahan earned first team All-Catholic League honors at Cardinal Dougherty High School. Callahan scored a touchdown the first 10 times he touched the football in intercollegiate play, leading the New York Times to report facetiously that "Jim Callahan of Temple is in a slump" after the 11th reception of his career did not go for a touchdown.

When his college career ended, Callahan held Temple Owls football records for most career points (218), most points in a season (86 in 1968), most points in a game (30 verses Bucknell University in 1966), most career touchdowns (36), most touchdowns in a season (14 in 1968), most career receptions (105), most receptions in a season (57 in 1968), most career receiving yards (1,848), most receiving yards in a season (786 in 1968), and most career receiving touchdowns (36).

Callahan also was on the receiving end of the longest pass play in Temple history; a 90-yard pass thrown by quarterback John Waller against Northeastern University in 1968. His five touchdown receptions against Bucknell in 1966, the most touchdown receptions for one game in Temple history, helped the Owls defeat Bucknell for the first time in 12 years.

After college, Callahan spent the 1969 pre-season with the Atlanta Falcons, but he was placed on waivers on September 1, 1969. He spent the remainder of the 1969 season with the Alabama Hawks of the Continental Football League; a farm team located in Huntsville, Alabama. He was inducted into the Temple University Hall of Fame in 1981.

Callahan authored the book WALLS in 1993 (with a revised edition in 1996). According to Callahan, WALLS is "based on the belief that life is not a series of unrelated random events. There is a process to how people gather and evaluate information and make the choices that direct their life. WALLS offers an opportunity for you to step out of your daily routine and explore some issues that have a tremendous impact on how you direct your life toward the outcome you desire."
