= Cardinal Dougherty High School =

Former Private Catholic school in Philadelphia, Pennsylvania, US

Location
- 6301 North 2nd Street; Philadelphia, Pennsylvania 19120; United States
- Coordinates: 40°2′49″N 75°7′19″W

Information
- Type: Private, co-educational
- Motto: Crucis In Signo Vinces (Conquer in the Sign of the Cross)
- Religious affiliation: Roman Catholic
- Established: 1956
- Status: Closed
- Closed: 2010
- President: Carl F. Janicki (closing president)
- Principal: Thomas F. Rooney Jr. (closing principal)
- Faculty: 41
- Grades: 9-12
- Enrollment: 784 (2008)
  - Grade 9: 177
  - Grade 10: 206
  - Grade 11: 196
  - Grade 12: 205
- Colors: Garnet and gold
- Mascot: Cardinals
- Accreditation: Middle States Association of Colleges and Schools
- Newspaper: Prelate
- Yearbook: Eminence

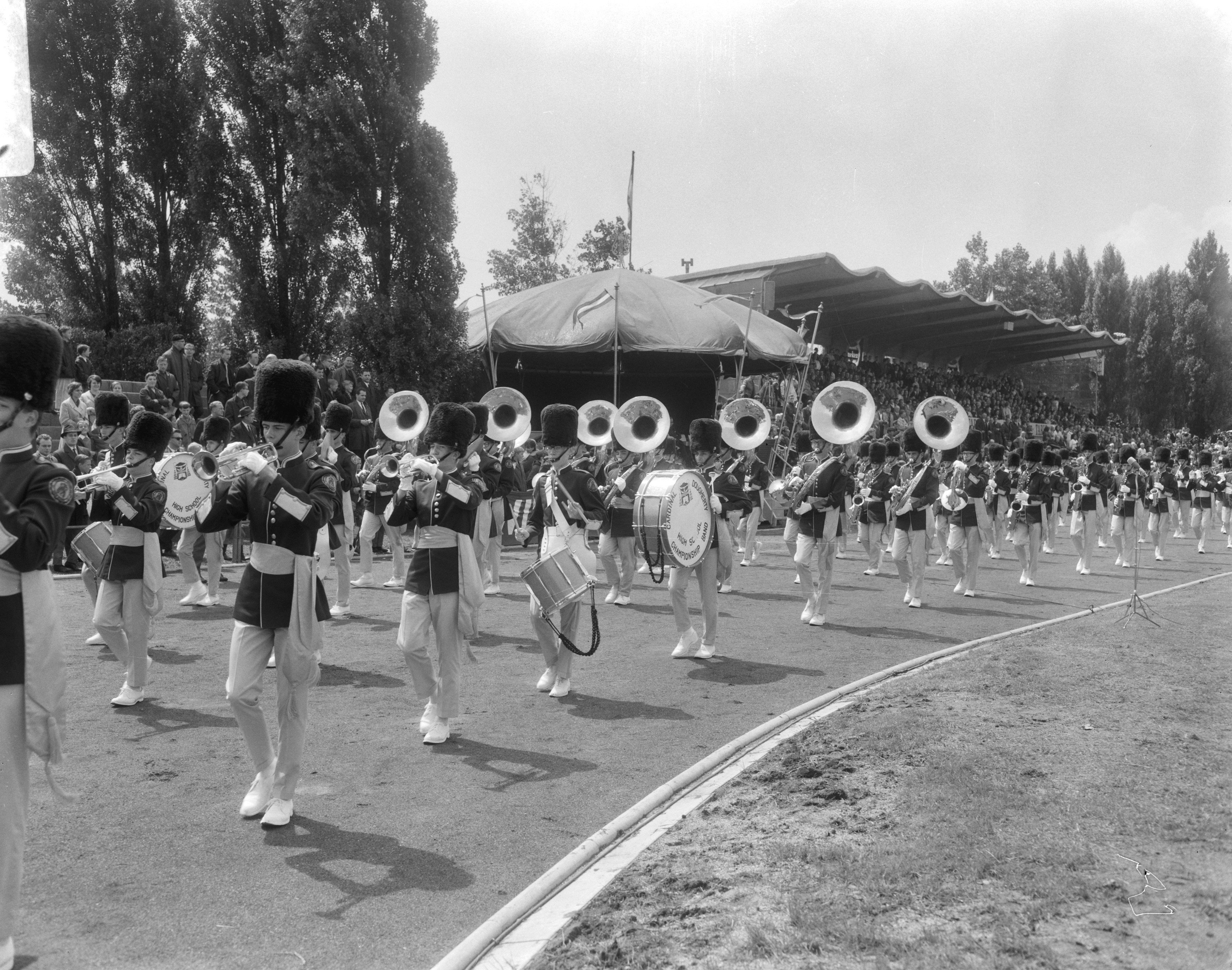
CDHS marching band at the World Music Championship 1966

Cardinal Dougherty High School (CDHS) was a private, Roman Catholic high school in Philadelphia, Pennsylvania. It was located in the Roman Catholic Archdiocese of Philadelphia and established in the East Oak Lane section of Philadelphia at 6301 North Second Street. The school was named for Cardinal Dennis Dougherty, Archbishop of Philadelphia from 1918 to 1951. Although CDHS was founded as a co-educational school, a wall separated the boys and girls side of the building. It was not until 1983 that boys and girls were educated together in the same classrooms.

The school opened in 1956, and enrollment peaked in 1965 with 5,944 students. However, that number would steadily declined as neighborhood demographics changed and free charter schools became available. When the school closed at the end of the 2009-2010 academic year, it was operating at about 30% capacity.

== Marching band ==
The CDHS marching band performed for Pope Paul VI at the Vatican, the 1962 NFL Championship Game, Lyndon B. Johnson's presidential inauguration in 1965, and won the World Music Championship in the Netherlands in 1966.

== Notable people ==
=== Alumni ===
- Brendan Boyle, Congressman
- Jim Callahan, NFL wide receiver
- Jim Cooper, NFL offensive tackle
- Michael Crescenz, US Army Medal of Honor awardee
- Michael Driscoll, Philadelphia City Council
- Jim Foster, women's basketball head coach
- Tom Gannon, Pennsylvania House of Representatives
- Len Hatzenbeller, professional basketball player
- Florian Kempf, NFL placekicker
- Kyle Lowry, NBA point guard
- Seamus McCaffery, Pennsylvania Supreme Court
- Cuttino Mobley, NBA shooting guard
- Harry Swayne, NFL offensive tackle
- Christopher Wogan, Pennsylvania House of Representatives, Philadelphia Common Pleas Court Judge

=== Staff ===
- Alex Ely, soccer midfielder, CDHS teacher and soccer coach
