= Penn's Landing =

Neighborhood in Philadelphia, US

- Neighborhood of Philadelphia
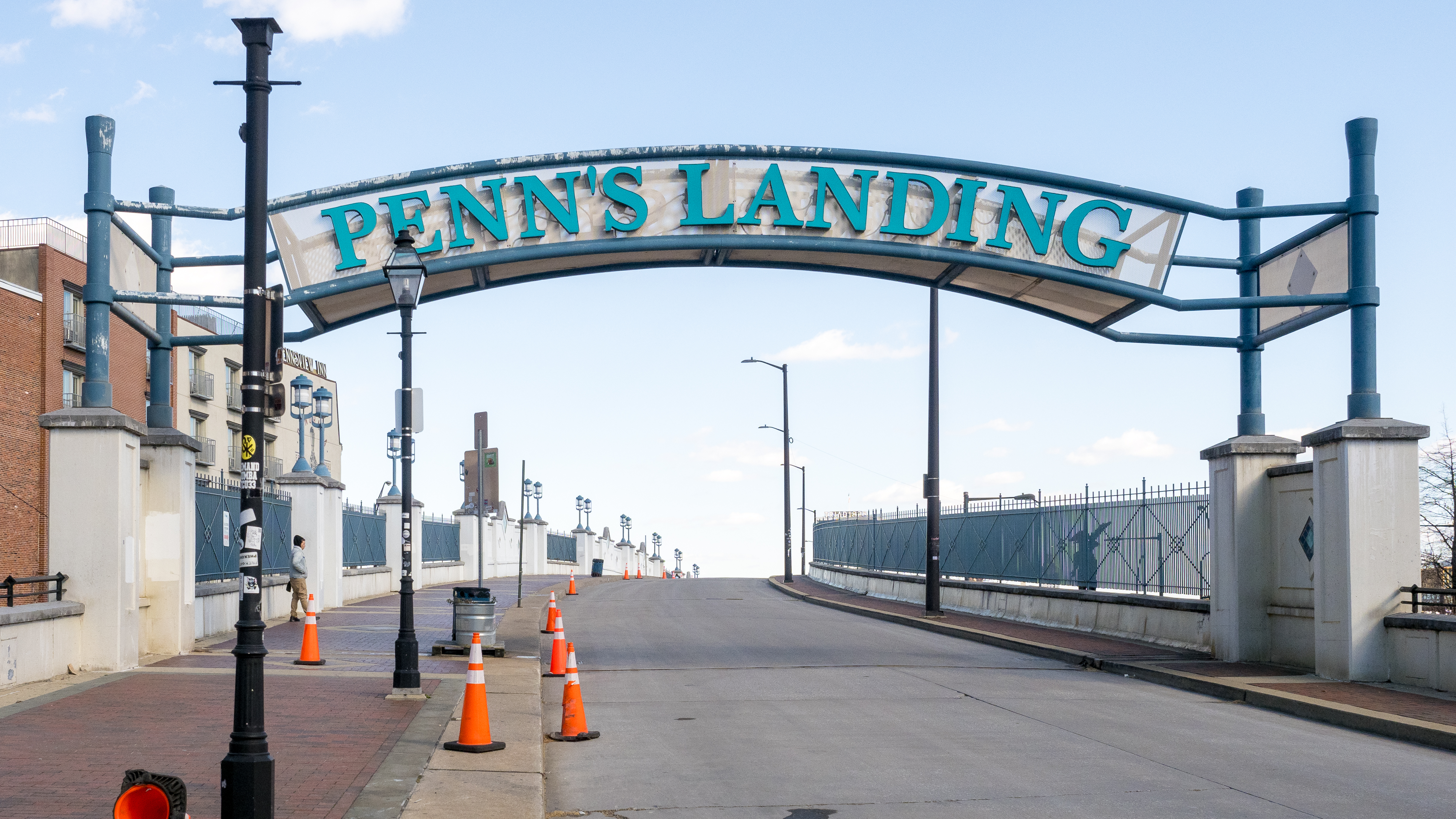
- The neon Penn's Landing sign in May 2024

- Location within Philadelphia
- Coordinates: 39°56′45″N 75°08′28″W
- Country: United States
- State: Pennsylvania
- County: Philadelphia
- City: Philadelphia
- Area codes: 215, 267, and 445

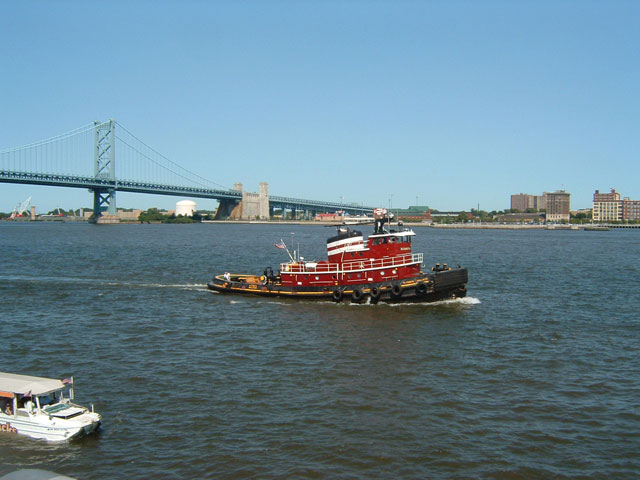
A tugboat off Penn's Landing in the Delaware River near the Benjamin Franklin Bridge in August 2007

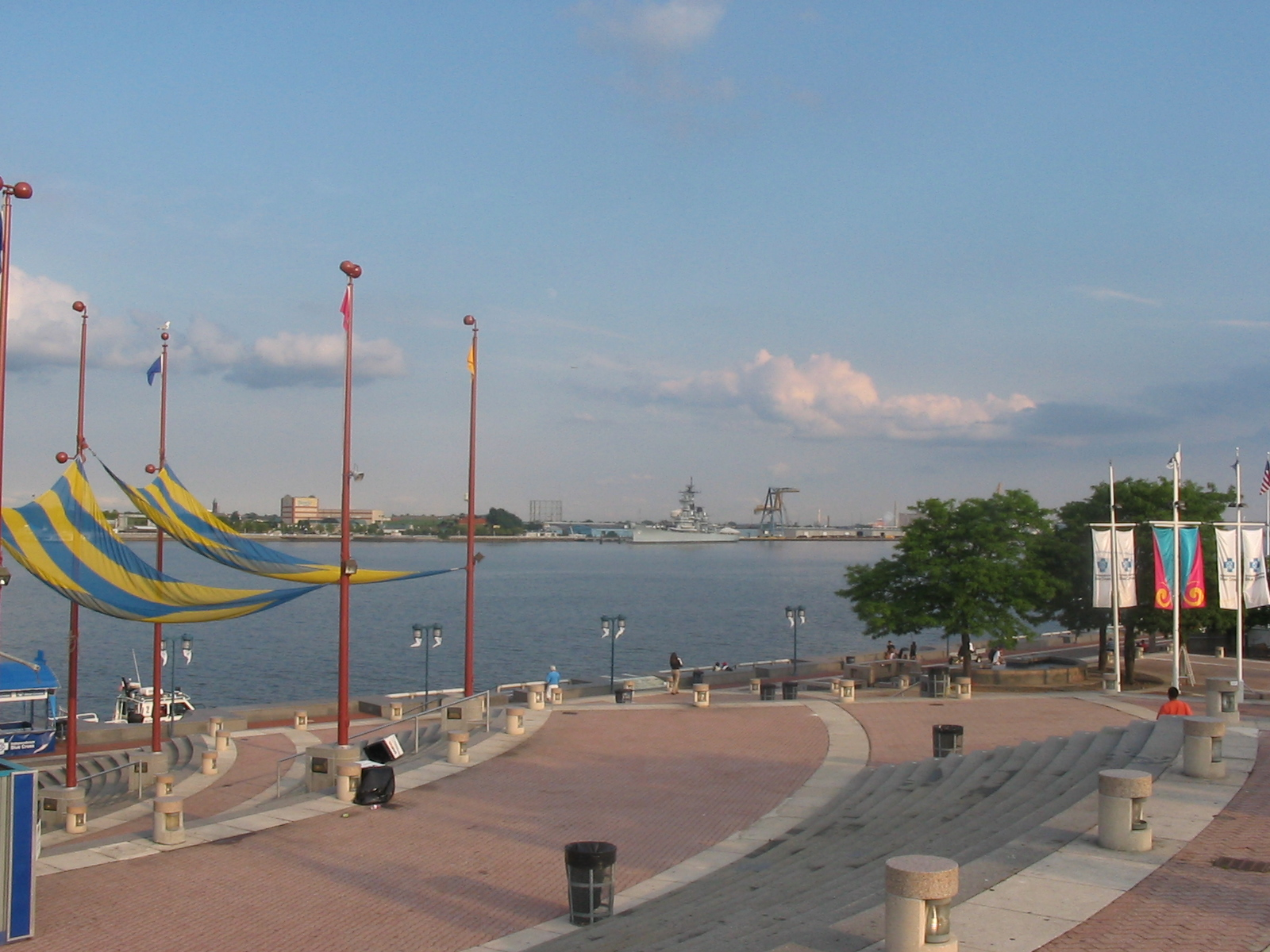
Penn's Landing (foreground), the Delaware River, and the USS New Jersey in Camden, New Jersey (background) in February 2009

Penn's Landing is a waterfront area of Center City Philadelphia, Pennsylvania, situated along the Delaware River. Its name commemorates the landing of William Penn, the founder of Pennsylvania, in 1682. The actual landing site is farther south, in Chester. The city of Philadelphia purchased the right to use the name. Penn's Landing is bounded by Front Street to the west, the Delaware River to the east, Spring Garden Street to the north, and Washington Avenue to the south, and is primarily focused on the Christopher Columbus Boulevard (Delaware Avenue) corridor.

Development of the area is handled by the Delaware River Waterfront Corporation. The corporation is a non-profit that was established in 2009 to manage the publicly owned land on the central waterfront on behalf of the City of Philadelphia and the Commonwealth of Pennsylvania.

== Features and uses ==
Penn's Landing serves as the site for several summertime events in the city. The main public space at Penn's Landing is The Great Plaza, a mostly concrete labyrinth located along the Delaware River at Christopher Columbus Boulevard and Chestnut Street.

Several historic ships are moored at Penn's Landing. The barque Moshulu is a floating restaurant; the World War II-era submarine USS Becuna and the Spanish–American War-era cruiser USS Olympia (C-6) are part of the Independence Seaport Museum; and the barquentine Gazela and tugboat Jupiter are moored there by the Philadelphia Ship Preservation Guild.

The RiverLink Ferry links Penn's Landing with the Camden Waterfront across the river in Camden, New Jersey.

The Blue Cross RiverRink is a skating rink and outdoor event facility located at Penn's Landing. During the winter months it operates as an ice skating rink and hosts the Blue Cross RiverRink WinterFest, featuring winter-themed decorations, fire pits, and an outdoor beer garden. The first Winterfest was held in 2013, concepted by Avram Hornik of FCM Hospitality, who also owns the neighboring outdoor waterfront restaurant, Morgan's Pier. During the summer months, the ice rink is converted into a roller skating rink under the name SummerFest.

== Spruce Street Harbor Park ==
Spruce Street Harbor Park is one of the main attractions at Penn's Landing. The park has a boardwalk along the Delaware River with a waterfront atmosphere with chairs, tables and hammocks. The park is open only seasonally in the summer or warm months, and closed during the winter.

== Monuments and memorials ==
There are many statues and monuments located in Penn's Landing:

- The Irish Memorial, history of the Great Famine (An Gorta Mor) and subsequent Irish immigration to the U.S., dedicated in 2003, sculpted by Glenna Goodacre
- Monument to Scottish Immigrants, dedicated in 2011, honors the contributions of Scottish immigrants to the United States
- Vietnam Veterans Memorial, dedicated in 1987 and designed by Perry M. Morgan
- Korean War Memorial, initially dedicated in 2002
- Christopher Columbus Memorial, dedicated in 1992, an obelisk designed by Venturi Scott Brown to commemorate the 500th anniversary of Columbus's landing in the Americas
- A bronze plaque monument marking the 250th anniversary of the 1747 creation of the "Associators", the predecessor of the Pennsylvania National Guard.

== Former trolley ==
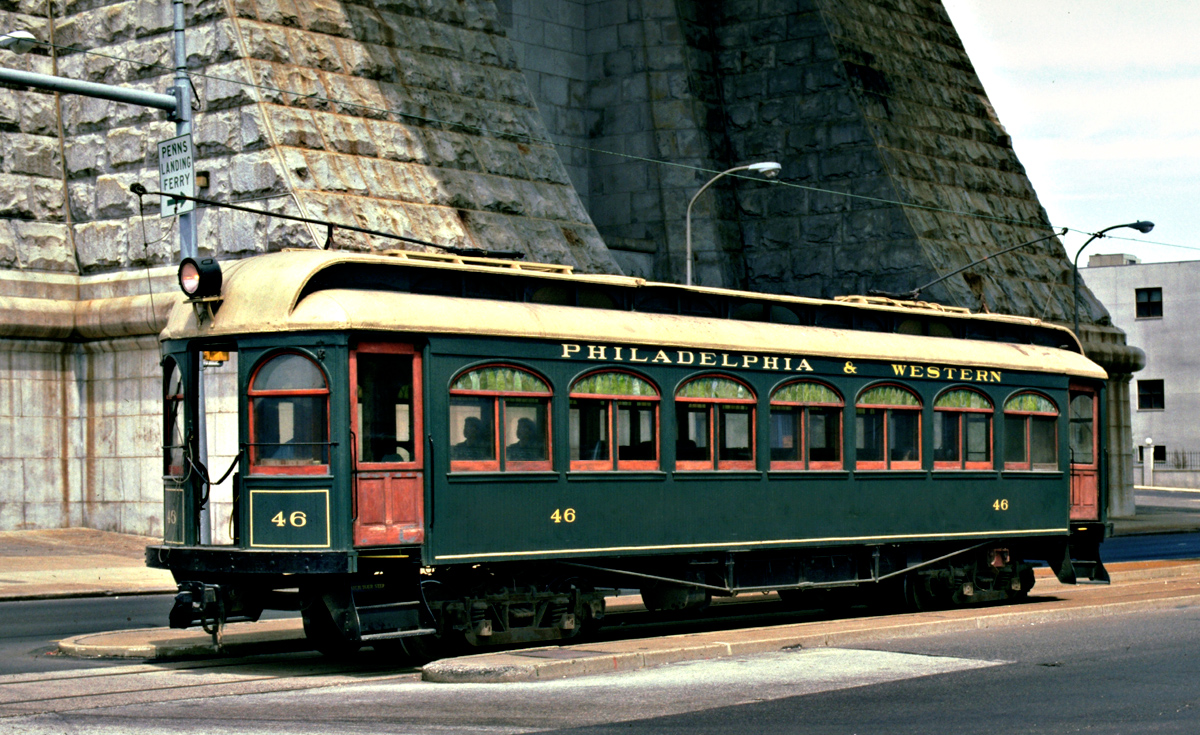
A 1907 interurban car on the former trolley line in 1990

From 1982 until 1995, a heritage trolley line (tramway) operated in Penn's Landing, on weekends and holidays from about April to October each year. Intended to attract tourists and help spur redevelopment of the area, the trolley line was established along a 1.1-mile (1.8 km) section of disused ex-Philadelphia Belt Line Railroad freight railroad track, owned by Conrail, from the Benjamin Franklin Bridge to Pier 51.

Grants from the city and Fidelity Bank funded the installation of overhead trolley wire and supporting poles, along with an electrical substation to provide power. Operation began on September 5, 1982, and was run by volunteers from the Buckingham Valley Trolley Association. The service used historic trolley cars on loan from museums. When not in use, the cars were stored in a building on city-owned Pier 51. The service ran for the last time on December 17, 1995, and the trolley wire and poles were removed by March 1996.

The Delaware River Port Authority is in the process of re-opening the Franklin Square PATCO station. It is being fully re-built to be bought in-line with the rest of the system, including a new headhouse, and accessible concourses and platforms. Construction has not yet commenced, but it is expected to open before 2024. Previously, discussion included re-opening the station and building out a PATCO-operated connection to a re-built trolley route on Delaware Avenue/Christopher Columbus Boulevard. No public discussion has commenced regarding the trolley route and no date has been set.

== Old Carpenter's Wharf ==
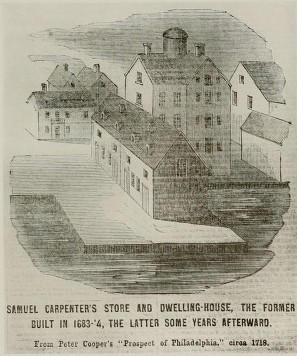
Samuel Carpenter's Store, House and Wharf, c. 1718

Samuel Carpenter (1649–1714) bought a lot extending from King Street (now Water Street) to Front Street and on to Second Street in 1683. This lot extends to Ton (now Tun) Alley. On the east side of this lot (Delaware front) he built a wharf, or "a fair key" as mentioned by William Penn, which was the first wharf built in Philadelphia. It became known as "Carpenter's Wharf" and could handle ships of 500 tons or more. Over the years it was expanded, modernized and would now be under Interstate-95 where the highway passes Penn's Landing.
