= USS Becuna =

United States Navy submarine

Coordinates: 39.943550°N 75.141179°W

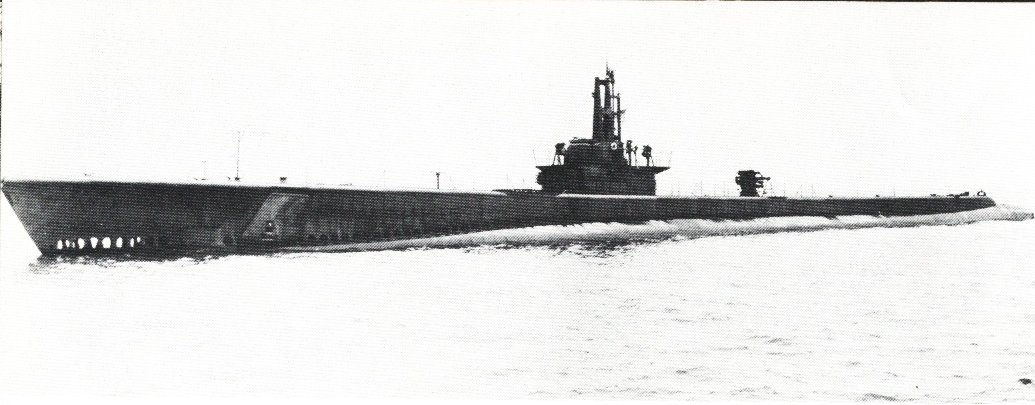
- USS Becuna (SS-319) after commissioning in May 1944.

History

United States
- Namesake: Becuna
- Ordered: 10 April 1942
- Builder: Electric Boat Company, Groton, Connecticut
- Laid down: 29 April 1943
- Launched: 30 January 1944
- Sponsored by: Mrs. George C. Crawford, wife of Commander Crawford
- Commissioned: 27 May 1944
- Decommissioned: 7 November 1969
- Stricken: 15 August 1973
- Motto: Tiger of the Sea
- Honors and awards: 4 Battle Stars
- Status: Museum ship at Philadelphia, 21 June 1976
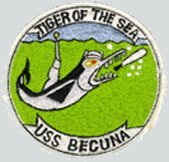
- Badge

General characteristics As built
- Class & type: Balao-class diesel-electric submarine
- Displacement: 1,500 long tons (1,500 t) surfaced; 2,080 long tons (2,110 t) submerged
- Length: 311 ft 9 in (95.02 m)
- Beam: 27 ft 3 in (8.31 m)
- Draft: 16 ft 10 in (5.13 m) maximum
- Propulsion: 4 × General Motors Model 16-278A V16 diesel engines driving electrical generators; 2 × 126-cell Sargo batteries; 4 × high-speed General Electric electric motors with reduction gears; 2 × propellers; 5,400 shp (4.0 MW) surfaced; 2,740 shp (2.0 MW) submerged
- Speed: 20.25 knots (38 km/h) surfaced; 8.75 knots (16 km/h) submerged
- Range: 11,000 nautical miles (20,000 km) surfaced at 10 knots (19 km/h)
- Endurance: 48 hours at 2 knots (3.7 km/h) submerged; 75 days on patrol
- Test depth: 400 ft (120 m)
- Complement: 10 officers, 72 enlisted
- Armament: 10 × 21-inch (533 mm) torpedo tubes; 6 forward, 4 aft; 24 torpedoes; 1 × 5-inch (127 mm) / 25 caliber deck gun; Bofors 40 mm and Oerlikon 20 mm cannon

General characteristics Guppy IA
- Class & type: none
- Displacement: 1,830 tons (1,859 t) surfaced; 2,440 tons (2,479 t) submerged
- Length: 307 ft 7 in (93.75 m)
- Beam: 27 ft 4 in (8.33 m)
- Draft: 17 ft (5.2 m)
- Propulsion: Snorkel added; Batteries upgraded to Sargo II
- Speed: Surfaced:17.3 knots (32.0 km/h) maximum; 12.5 knots (23.2 km/h) cruising; Submerged: 15.0 knots (27.8 km/h) for 1/2 hour; 7.5 knots (13.9 km/h) snorkeling; 3.0 knots (5.6 km/h) cruising
- Range: 17,000 nmi (31,000 km; 20,000 mi) surfaced at 11 knots (20 km/h; 13 mph)
- Endurance: 36 hours at 3 knots (5.6 km/h; 3.5 mph) submerged
- Complement: 10 officers; 5 petty officers; 64–69 enlisted men
- Armament: 10 × 21 inch (533 mm) torpedo tubes; (6 forward, 4 aft); all guns removed
- USS Becuna (SS-319)
- U.S. National Register of Historic Places
- U.S. National Historic Landmark
- Location within Pennsylvania
- Location: Penn's Landing, Christopher Columbus Boulevard & Spruce Street, Philadelphia, Pennsylvania, United States
- Area: less than one acre
- Built: 1944
- Built by: Electric Boat Co.
- Architectural style: Balao-class submarine
- NRHP reference No.: 78002458
- Added to NRHP: 29 August 1978

USS Becuna (SS/AGSS-319), a Balao-class submarine in commission from 1944 to 1969, was a submarine of the United States Navy named for the becuna, a pike-like fish of Europe. During World War II, she conducted five war patrols between 23 August 1944 and 27 July 1945, operating in the Philippine Islands, South China Sea, and Java Sea. She is credited with sinking two Japanese tankers totaling 3,888 gross register tons.

After World War II, Becuna operated as part of the United States Pacific Fleet from 1945 to 1949. She served in the United States Atlantic Fleet from 1949 to 1969, primarily as a training ship, although she also made two deployments with the United States Sixth Fleet in the Mediterranean Sea.

After her decommissioning, Becuna was designated a National Historic Landmark for her service in World War II. She became a museum ship at the Independence Seaport Museum in Philadelphia, Pennsylvania.

== Construction and commissioning ==
Becuna was laid down on 29 April 1943 by the Electric Boat Company at Groton, Connecticut. She was launched on 30 January 1944, sponsored by Mrs. George C. Crawford, and commissioned on 27 May 1944.

== Service history ==
=== World War II ===
==== May–August 1944 ====
After shakedown training from Naval Submarine Base New London, Becuna departed Groton on 1 July 1944 and arrived at Pearl Harbor, Hawaii, on 29 July 1944. She then conducted additional training in the Hawaiian Islands.

==== First war patrol ====
Becuna departed Pearl Harbor on 23 August 1944 for her first war patrol. After patrolling for a month without spotting anything but aircraft, she surfaced on the afternoon of 25 September 1944 and her lookouts spied a convoy of three Japanese merchant ships escorted by a destroyer. Becuna submerged and fired a spread of six torpedoes. While she evaded a retaliatory depth-charge attack, her crew heard an explosion but could not verify any sinkings; although she claimed to have destroyed two tankers in the convoy, postwar examination of Japanese records failed to verify the kills. She had a similar experience on 8 October 1944 when she launched torpedoes at a heavily escorted tanker north of Palawan Passage in the Philippine Islands. Again her crew heard two distinct explosions but were too busy dodging depth charges to observe the results of the attack. On 9 October 1944, however, she recorded her first verifiable success when she joined the submarine USS Hawkbill (SS-366) in sinking the 1,943-gross register ton Japanese cargo ship Tokuwa Maru. Later in October 1944, she concluded her patrol, putting into Fremantle, Australia, for a refit.

==== Second war patrol ====
On 16 November 1944, Becuna stood out of Fremantle and embarked on her second war patrol. She cruised the waters of the South China Sea off the southern coast of Japanese-occupied French Indochina searching for Japanese fleet units. On 23 December 1944 she encountered the Japanese heavy cruiser Ashigara and light cruiser Oyodo, which she mistakenly identified as a Yamato-class battleship and a "Nachi-class"(i.e., Myōkō-class) heavy cruiser, respectively. Lack of time prevented her from achieving a favorable setup before they entered Cam Ranh Bay on the coast of French Indochina. The remainder of Becuna′s patrol proved almost equally unsuccessful. She destroyed floating naval mines and, on her way back to Fremantle, sank two "sea trucks" — the American term for a type of small Japanese cargo ship — with her deck gun just north of Lombok Strait. During January 1945 she underwent a refit at Fremantle.

==== Third war patrol ====
Becuna embarked on her third war patrol in February 1945. She returned to the South China Sea off the coast of French Indochina, where she encountered a Japanese convoy off Cap Padaran on the morning of 22 February 1945. She fired a spread of torpedoes at the tanker Nichiryu Maru and sent her to the bottom. She endured a barrage of 70 depth charges from two escort vessels before escaping. She sighted no other Japanese shipping, and her patrol ended with her arrival at Subic Bay on Luzon in the Philippine Islands, where she underwent a refit.

==== Fourth war patrol ====
Becuna departed Subic Bay to begin her fourth war patrol in May 1945. She sighted no Japanese ships, and proceeded to Fremantle, where she arrived in early June 1945 and underwent a refit.

==== Fifth war patrol ====
On 21 June 1945, Becuna got underway from Fremantle for her fifth war patrol. On two occasions, Imperial Japanese Navy floatplanes on antisubmarine patrol subjected her to bombing attacks. Then, on the night of 15 July 1945, she made radar contact on a single fast-moving target in the Java Sea. After tracking it for several hours, she fired a spread of torpedoes in a night surface attack. They all missed, but the submarine USS Baya (SS-318) took up the chase and sank the vessel, the Ambon Island-bound Japanese torpedo boat Kari. Becuna concluded her patrol at Subic Bay late in July 1945. While she was still undergoing a refit there, World War II ended on 15 August 1945 with the cessation of hostilities with Japan.

=== Post-World War II service ===
Becuna returned to the United States at San Diego, California, on 22 September 1945. She then served in the United States Pacific Fleet until 1949, conducting submarine crew training missions and participating in various multiship exercises. She visited Japan from 15 November – 9 December 1947 and from 31 October – 6 November 1948 and China from 7 to 29 November 1948.

In April 1949, Becuna was transferred to the United States Atlantic Fleet as a unit of Submarine Squadron 8. She operated from Groton, Connecticut, conducting refresher training exercises and frequently serving as a school ship for students at the Submarine School. That duty continued until November 1950, when she entered the shipyard of the Electric Boat Company at Groton for nine-month conversion under the Greater Underwater Propulsive Power (GUPPY) Program to a GUPPY IA submarine. She received additional batteries, a submarine snorkel, and a streamlined sail as well as a number of other modifications to various items of equipment.

Becuna completed the conversion in August 1951 and then conducted shakedown and refresher training in the West Indies. She returned to Naval Submarine Base New London Groton in September 1951. Over the ensuing 18 years, she operated from Groton, performing a variety of peacetime missions, most of them involving training. She served as a training ship for students at the Submarine School, and prospective submarine commanding officers made their familiarization cruises aboard her. She also provided test services to the Test and Evaluation Force and trained United States Naval Reserve personnel.

Becuna made two deployments to serve with the United States Sixth Fleet in the Mediterranean Sea, where she made numerous port visits. She also participated in many exercises with U.S. and foreign naval units. She made one cruise to Scotland, occasionally visited northern European ports, and was a frequent caller at ports in Canada, along the United States East Coast, and in the West Indies. In 1969, she was reclassified as an auxiliary submarine and given the hull classification symbol AGSS-319.

== Decommissioning and disposal ==
Becuna was decommissioned on 7 November 1969 and laid up in the Atlantic Reserve Fleet at Philadelphia, Pennsylvania. Her hull classification symbol reverted to SS-319 in 1971.

Becuna remained in reserve at Philadelphia until 15 August 1973, when her name was stricken from the Naval Vessel Register. In 1974, a prospective transfer of Becuna to Venezuela fell through. On 21 June 1976, she was donated to the Cruiser Olympia Association for use as a memorial.

== Honors and awards ==
- Asiatic-Pacific Campaign Medal with four battle stars for World War II service
- World War II Victory Medal
- Navy Occupation Service Medal with "ASIA" clasp
- China Service Medal
- National Defense Service Medal with star

== Museum ship ==
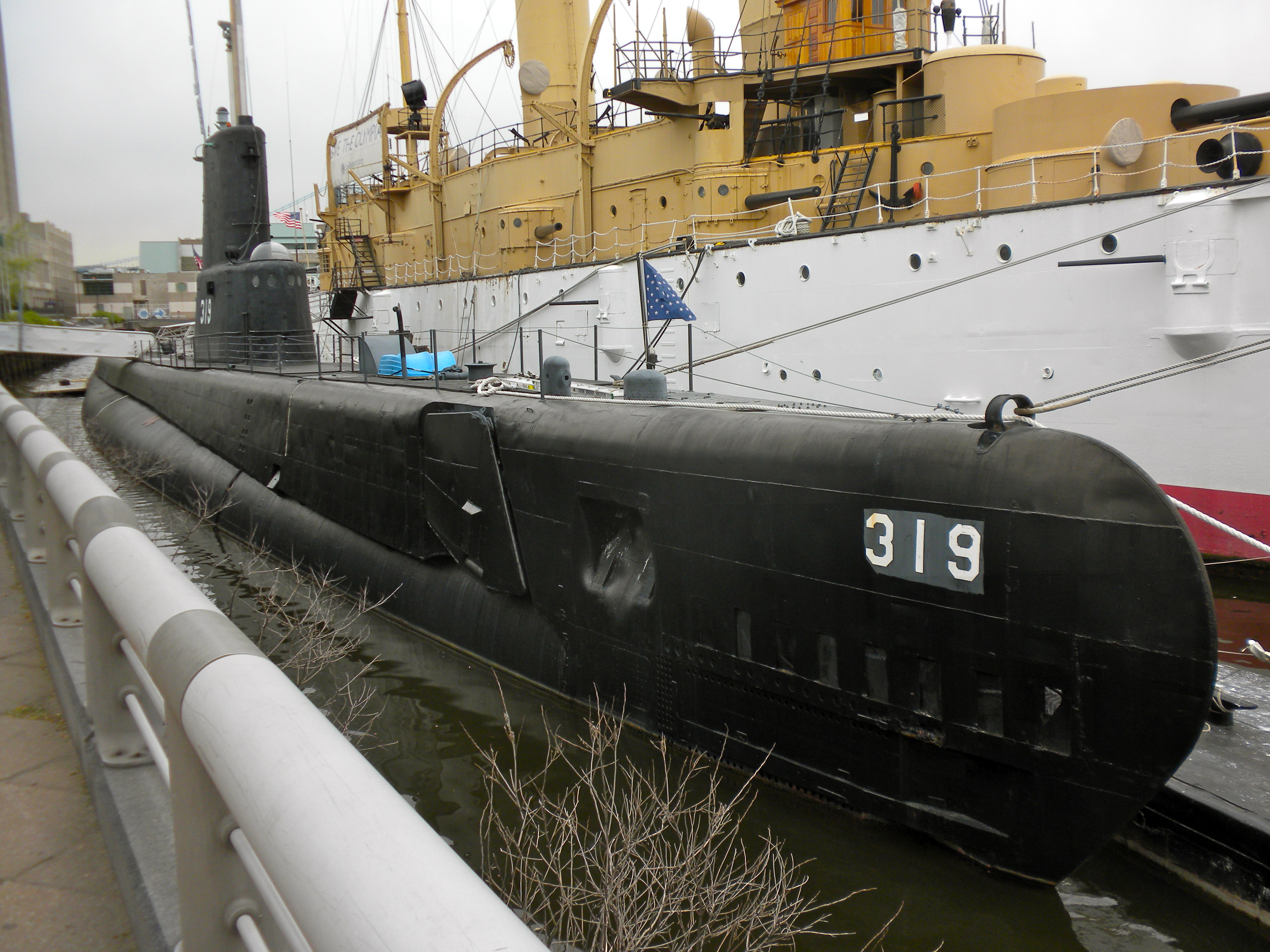
Becuna in Philadelphia. Note the difference in her appearance after her extensive modernization in 1951.

Becuna was placed on permanent display adjacent to the cruiser USS Olympia (C-6) at Penn's Landing in Philadelphia, Pennsylvania, on 21 June 1976. Becuna was designated a National Historic Landmark in 1986. Since 1996, both vessels have been operated by the Independence Seaport Museum. Becuna received the Historical Welded Structure Award of the American Welding Society in 2001.

== See also ==
- List of National Historic Landmarks in Philadelphia
- National Register of Historic Places listings in Center City, Philadelphia
