= Philadelphia Vietnam Veterans Memorial =

Memorial in Philadelphia, Pennsylvania, US

- United States
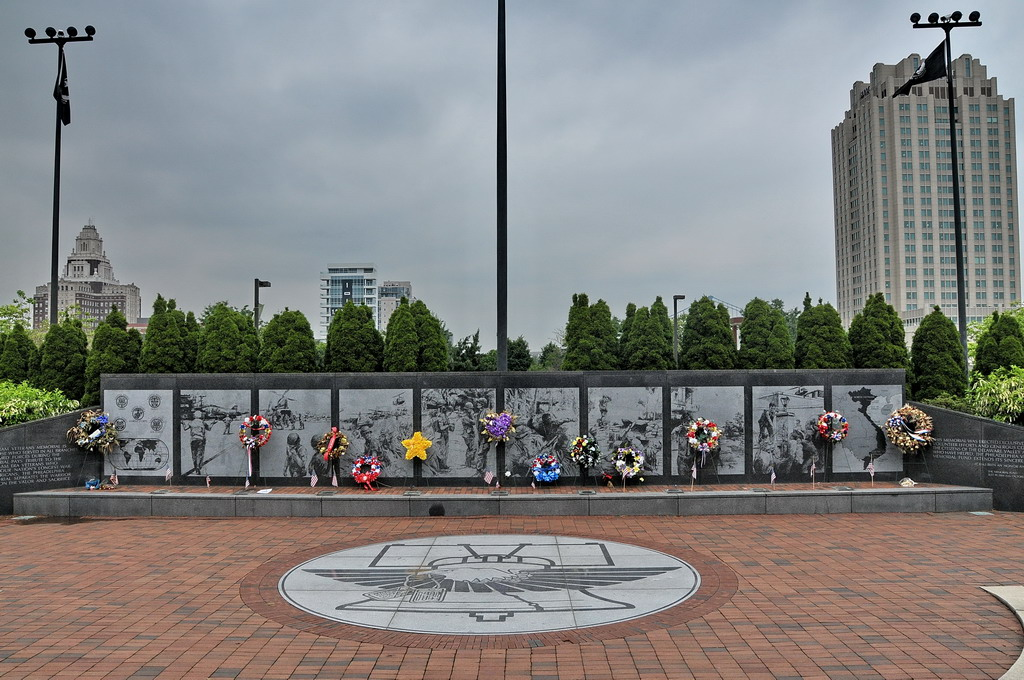
- Ten panels depict scenes of the War.
- For all 648 Vietnam War servicemen from Philadelphia
- Established: 1987
- Location: 39.943910°N 75.142825°W; Spruce and Columbus Blvd, Philadelphia, Pennsylvania
- Designed by: Perry M. Morgan
- The Philadelphia Vietnam Veterans Memorial is designed to honor those who served in all branches of the United States Armed Forces during the Vietnam War. The memorial pays tribute to the 80,000 Philadelphia Vietnam Era Veterans who served our country in our nation's longest war. By honoring these veterans the Philadelphia Vietnam Veterans Memorial separates the warrior from the war, focuses on the valor and sacrifice of those patriots, and gives each of them a place in history. It is our duty to remember the gallant Americans whose names grace this wall. They sacrificed their lives in the service of our country during the Vietnam War 1964-1975. For those who fought for it, freedom has a flavor the protected will never know.

The Philadelphia Vietnam Veterans Memorial at Penn's Landing in Philadelphia, Pennsylvania was dedicated in 1987. The memorial includes the names of 648 servicemen who were killed in action or listed as missing in action during the Vietnam War from Philadelphia.

The memorial is designed as an amphitheatre plaza, with the names of each soldier etched in granite on the south wall. There are also ten panels depicting scenes of the War from the beginning to the final rescue of Vietnamese refugees in 1975.

Programs are held here to commemorate the lives lost during the War.

The Philadelphia Vietnam Veterans Memorial Fund works to preserve and enhance the memorial, and offers education programs about the War.

== History ==
The memorial's design, created by local architect Perry M. Morgan, was chosen over 102 entries after a national competition. It initially featured the names of 630 servicemen.

In 2015, the memorial was rededicated after a seven-year restoration and redesign to make it more accessible for those with disabilities.

In 2016, the names of two additional soldiers were added to the wall.

== See also ==
- Vietnam Veterans Memorial, Washington, DC
